= 1977 Boston College Eagles football team =

American college football season

1977 Boston College Eagles football
- Conference: Independent
- Record: 6–5
- Head coach: Joe Yukica (10th season)
- Captains: Kelly Elias; Bob Moore; Rich Scudellari
- Home stadium: Alumni Stadium

1977 NCAA Division I independents football records
	Conf.					Overall
Team	W		L		T	W		L		T
No. 1 Notre Dame		–		–		11	–	1	–	0
No. 5 Penn State		–		–		11	–	1	–	0
Colgate		–		–		10	–	1	–	0
North Texas State *		–		–		10	–	1	–	0
No. 16 San Diego State		–		–		10	–	1	–	0
Tennessee State		–		–		8	–	1	–	1
No. 14 Florida State		–		–		10	–	2	–	0
No. 8 Pittsburgh		–		–		9	–	2	–	1
East Carolina		–		–		8	–	3	–	0
Rutgers		–		–		8	–	3	–	0
Army		–		–		7	–	4	–	0
Louisville		–		–		7	–	4	–	1
Boston College		–		–		6	–	5	–	0
Cincinnati		–		–		5	–	4	–	2
Georgia Tech		–		–		6	–	5	–	0
Memphis State		–		–		6	–	5	–	0
Northwestern State		–		–		6	–	5	–	0
Syracuse		–		–		6	–	5	–	0
William & Mary		–		–		6	–	5	–	0
Southern Miss		–		–		6	–	5	–	0
Temple		–		–		5	–	5	–	1
Hawaii		–		–		5	–	6	–	0
Navy		–		–		5	–	6	–	0
West Virginia		–		–		5	–	6	–	0
South Carolina		–		–		5	–	7	–	0
Utah State		–		–		4	–	7	–	0
Villanova		–		–		4	–	7	–	0
Illinois State		–		–		3	–	7	–	1
Virginia Tech		–		–		3	–	7	–	1
Miami (FL)		–		–		3	–	8	–	0
Richmond		–		–		3	–	8	–	0
Tulane		–		–		3	–	8	–	0
Air Force		–		–		2	–	8	–	1
Holy Cross		–		–		2	–	8	–	0
Northeast Louisiana		–		–		2	–	9	–	0
North Texas State (originally 9–2) awarded a forfeit win after Mississippi State was found to be using an ineligible player.; Rankings from AP Poll

The 1977 Boston College Eagles football team represented Boston College as an independent during the 1977 NCAA Division I football season. In its tenth and final season under head coach Joe Yukica, the team compiled a 6–5 record and were outscored by a total of 269 to 242.

The team's statistical leaders included Ken Smith with 2,073 passing yards, Dan Conway with 613 rushing yards, and Mike Godbolt with 711 receiving yards.

After the season, coach Yukica left Boston College to become head coach at Dartmouth. He compiled a 68-37 record in 10 years at Boston College.

The team played its home games at Alumni Stadium in Chestnut Hill, Massachusetts.

== Schedule ==
Date	Opponent	Site	Result	Attendance	Source
September 10	at Texas	Texas Memorial Stadium; Austin, TX	L 0–44	50,000	
September 17	at Tennessee	Neyland Stadium; Knoxville, TN	L 18–24	83,263	
September 24	Army	Alumni Stadium; Chestnut Hill, MA	W 49–28	19,200	
October 1	No. 16 Pittsburgh	Alumni Stadium; Chestnut Hill, MA	L 7–45	24,881	
October 8	Tulane	Alumni Stadium; Chestnut Hill, MA	W 30–28	18,577	
October 15	at West Virginia	Mountaineer Field; Morgantown, WV	W 28–24	36,211	
October 22	Villanova	Alumni Stadium; Chestnut Hill, MA	W 17–0	26,222	
October 29	at Air Force	Falcon Stadium; Colorado Springs, CO	W 36–14	21,663	
November 12	at Syracuse	Archbold Stadium; Syracuse, NY	L 3–20	16,409	
November 19	UMass	Alumni Stadium; Chestnut Hill, MA (rivalry)	W 34–7	30,846	
November 26	at Holy Cross	Fitton Field; Worcester, MA (rivalry)	L 20–35	12,006	
Rankings from AP Poll released prior to the game

== Roster ==
1977 Boston College Eagles football team roster
Players
Coaches
Offense

Pos.	#	Name	Class
TE	87	Tom Carr	So
WR	24	Jim O'Brien	Jr
QB	10	Joe O'Brien	Sr
OT	72	Jim Rourke	Jr
TE	83	Tim Sherwin	Fr
QB	6	Ken Smith	Sr
OT	64	Karl Swanke	So

Defense

Pos.	#	Name	Class
LB	52	Jeff Dziama	So
DL	91	Bill Ohrenberger	Jr
DB	27	Jeff Ryan	So
DT	71	Fred Smerlas	Jr

Special teams

Pos.	#	Name	Class

Head coach

- Joe Yukica

Coordinators/assistant coaches

Legend

- (C) Team captain
- (S) Suspended
- (I) Ineligible
- Injured
- Redshirt
