= 1977 Louisville Cardinals football team =

American college football season

1977 Louisville Cardinals football

Independence Bowl, L 14–24 vs. Louisiana Tech
- Conference: Independent
- Record: 7–4–1
- Head coach: Vince Gibson (3rd season)
- Home stadium: Fairgrounds Stadium

1977 NCAA Division I independents football records
| | Conf. | | | | | Overall |
| Team | W | | L | | T | W | | L | | T |
|---|---|---|---|---|---|---|---|---|---|---|
| No. 1 Notre Dame | | – | | – | | 11 | – | 1 | – | 0 |
| No. 5 Penn State | | – | | – | | 11 | – | 1 | – | 0 |
| Colgate | | – | | – | | 10 | – | 1 | – | 0 |
| North Texas State * | | – | | – | | 10 | – | 1 | – | 0 |
| No. 16 San Diego State | | – | | – | | 10 | – | 1 | – | 0 |
| Tennessee State | | – | | – | | 8 | – | 1 | – | 1 |
| No. 14 Florida State | | – | | – | | 10 | – | 2 | – | 0 |
| No. 8 Pittsburgh | | – | | – | | 9 | – | 2 | – | 1 |
| East Carolina | | – | | – | | 8 | – | 3 | – | 0 |
| Rutgers | | – | | – | | 8 | – | 3 | – | 0 |
| Army | | – | | – | | 7 | – | 4 | – | 0 |
| Louisville | | – | | – | | 7 | – | 4 | – | 1 |
| Boston College | | – | | – | | 6 | – | 5 | – | 0 |
| Cincinnati | | – | | – | | 5 | – | 4 | – | 2 |
| Georgia Tech | | – | | – | | 6 | – | 5 | – | 0 |
| Memphis State | | – | | – | | 6 | – | 5 | – | 0 |
| Northwestern State | | – | | – | | 6 | – | 5 | – | 0 |
| Syracuse | | – | | – | | 6 | – | 5 | – | 0 |
| William & Mary | | – | | – | | 6 | – | 5 | – | 0 |
| Southern Miss | | – | | – | | 6 | – | 5 | – | 0 |
| Temple | | – | | – | | 5 | – | 5 | – | 1 |
| Hawaii | | – | | – | | 5 | – | 6 | – | 0 |
| Navy | | – | | – | | 5 | – | 6 | – | 0 |
| West Virginia | | – | | – | | 5 | – | 6 | – | 0 |
| South Carolina | | – | | – | | 5 | – | 7 | – | 0 |
| Utah State | | – | | – | | 4 | – | 7 | – | 0 |
| Villanova | | – | | – | | 4 | – | 7 | – | 0 |
| Illinois State | | – | | – | | 3 | – | 7 | – | 1 |
| Virginia Tech | | – | | – | | 3 | – | 7 | – | 1 |
| Miami (FL) | | – | | – | | 3 | – | 8 | – | 0 |
| Richmond | | – | | – | | 3 | – | 8 | – | 0 |
| Tulane | | – | | – | | 3 | – | 8 | – | 0 |
| Air Force | | – | | – | | 2 | – | 8 | – | 1 |
| Holy Cross | | – | | – | | 2 | – | 8 | – | 0 |
| Northeast Louisiana | | – | | – | | 2 | – | 9 | – | 0 |
North Texas State (originally 9–2) awarded a forfeit win after Mississippi State was found to be using an ineligible player.; Rankings from AP Poll

The 1977 Louisville Cardinals football team was an American football team that represented the University of Louisville as an independent during the 1977 NCAA Division I football season. In their third season under head coach Vince Gibson, the Cardinals compiled a 7–4–1 record and outscored opponents by a total of 291 to 194.

The team's statistical leaders included Stu Stram with 455 passing yards, Calvin Prince with 1,050 rushing yards and 78 points scored, and Marc Mitchell with 358 receiving yards.

== Schedule ==
| Date | Opponent | Site | Result | Attendance | Source |
|---|---|---|---|---|---|
| September 10 | Northern Illinois | Fairgrounds Stadium; Louisville, KY | W 38–0 | 16,453 | |
| September 17 | Cincinnati | Fairgrounds Stadium; Louisville, KY (rivalry) | T 17–17 | 25,384 | |
| September 24 | William & Mary | Fairgrounds Stadium; Louisville, KY | L 7–21 | 20,571 | |
| October 1 | at Memphis State | Liberty Bowl Memorial Stadium; Memphis, TN (rivalry) | W 14–13 | 22,750 | |
| October 8 | Tulsa | Fairgrounds Stadium; Louisville, KY | W 33–0 | 12,007 | |
| October 15 | at Dayton | Welcome Stadium; Dayton, OH | L 10–14 | 11,091 | |
| October 22 | at No. 3 Alabama | Bryant–Denny Stadium; Tuscaloosa, AL | L 6–55 | 60,210 | |
| October 29 | at Marshall | Fairfield Stadium; Huntington, WV | W 56–0 | 10,232 | |
| November 5 | Wichita State | Fairgrounds Stadium; Louisville, KY | W 51–21 | 12,031 | |
| November 12 | Drake | Fairgrounds Stadium; Louisville, KY | W 18–13 | 12,247 | |
| November 20 | Indiana State | Fairgrounds Stadium; Louisville, KY | W 27–16 | 11,847 | |
| December 17 | vs. Louisiana Tech | State Fair Stadium; Shreveport, LA (Independence Bowl) | L 14–24 | 22,223 | |
Rankings from AP Poll released prior to the game

== Roster ==
1977 Louisville Cardinals football team roster
Players
Coaches
Offense

| Pos. | # | Name | Class |
|---|---|---|---|
| TE | 82 | Mark Besanceney | Jr |
| QB | | Randy Butler |
| QB | 14 | Jim Didier | So |
| RB | | Bo Haden |
| OT | 75 | Joe Jacoby | Fr |
| RB | | Larry Johnican |
| WR | 2 | Kevin Miller | Sr |
| WR | | Marc Mitchell |
| RB | | Ron Moon |
| QB | | Terry Mullins |
| WR | | Gary Nord |
| RB | 32 | Nathan Poole | Jr |
| RB | | Calvin Prince |
| WR | | Kenny Robinson |
| WR | | Tony Smith |
| QB | 16 | Stu Stram | So |
| RB | | John Tillery |
| G | 64 | Jerry Ward | Sr |
| C | 69 | Charles Whitehead | So |
| WR | | Ebb Williams |

Defense

| Pos. | # | Name | Class |
|---|---|---|---|
| DL | 73 | Tom Abood | Sr |
| LB | 38 | Brian Bell | Sr |
| DB | 12 | David Bradshaw | Sr |
| DB | | Zarko Ellis |
| DL | | Nick Gagel |
| DB | | Greg Gibson |
| LB | | Don Harold |
| DB | | Ray Payton |
| LB | | Billy Perrin |
| DB | | Gerald Saunders |
| DB | | Dan Simpson |
| LB | 50 | Otis Wilson | So |
| CB | 10 | Dwayne Woodruff | Jr |

Special teams

| Pos. | # | Name | Class |
|---|---|---|---|
| K | | Mike Mager |
| K | | Pedro Posadas |
| P | | Rich Pennella |

Head coach

- Vince Gibson

Coordinators/assistant coaches

Legend

- (C) Team captain
- (S) Suspended
- (I) Ineligible
- Injured
- Redshirt
