= 1977 West Virginia Mountaineers football team =

American college football season

1977 West Virginia Mountaineers football
- Conference: Independent
- Record: 5–6
- Head coach: Frank Cignetti Sr. (2nd season)
- Offensive coordinator: Joe Pendry (2nd season)
- Home stadium: Mountaineer Field

1977 NCAA Division I independents football records
	Conf.					Overall
Team	W		L		T	W		L		T
No. 1 Notre Dame		–		–		11	–	1	–	0
No. 5 Penn State		–		–		11	–	1	–	0
Colgate		–		–		10	–	1	–	0
North Texas State *		–		–		10	–	1	–	0
No. 16 San Diego State		–		–		10	–	1	–	0
Tennessee State		–		–		8	–	1	–	1
No. 14 Florida State		–		–		10	–	2	–	0
No. 8 Pittsburgh		–		–		9	–	2	–	1
East Carolina		–		–		8	–	3	–	0
Rutgers		–		–		8	–	3	–	0
Army		–		–		7	–	4	–	0
Louisville		–		–		7	–	4	–	1
Boston College		–		–		6	–	5	–	0
Cincinnati		–		–		5	–	4	–	2
Georgia Tech		–		–		6	–	5	–	0
Memphis State		–		–		6	–	5	–	0
Northwestern State		–		–		6	–	5	–	0
Syracuse		–		–		6	–	5	–	0
William & Mary		–		–		6	–	5	–	0
Southern Miss		–		–		6	–	5	–	0
Temple		–		–		5	–	5	–	1
Hawaii		–		–		5	–	6	–	0
Navy		–		–		5	–	6	–	0
West Virginia		–		–		5	–	6	–	0
South Carolina		–		–		5	–	7	–	0
Utah State		–		–		4	–	7	–	0
Villanova		–		–		4	–	7	–	0
Illinois State		–		–		3	–	7	–	1
Virginia Tech		–		–		3	–	7	–	1
Miami (FL)		–		–		3	–	8	–	0
Richmond		–		–		3	–	8	–	0
Tulane		–		–		3	–	8	–	0
Air Force		–		–		2	–	8	–	1
Holy Cross		–		–		2	–	8	–	0
Northeast Louisiana		–		–		2	–	9	–	0
North Texas State (originally 9–2) awarded a forfeit win after Mississippi State was found to be using an ineligible player.; Rankings from AP Poll

The 1977 West Virginia Mountaineers football team represented West Virginia University in the 1977 NCAA Division I football season. It was the Mountaineers' 85th overall season and they competed as an independent. The team was led by head coach Frank Cignetti Sr., in his second-year, and played their home games at Mountaineer Field in Morgantown, West Virginia. They finished the season with a record 5–6.

== Schedule ==
Date	Opponent	Rank	Site	Result	Attendance	Source
September 10	Richmond		Mountaineer Field; Morgantown, WV	W 36–0	35,545	
September 17	at No. 11 Maryland		Byrd Stadium; College Park, MD (rivalry)	W 24–16	45,123	
September 24	at Kentucky	No. 17	Commonwealth Stadium; Lexington, KY	L 13–28	57,796	
October 1	at Virginia		Scott Stadium; Charlottesville, VA	W 13–0	21,500	
October 8	Temple		Mountaineer Field; Morgantown, WV	W 38–16	32,822	
October 15	Boston College^{†}		Mountaineer Field; Morgantown, WV	L 24–28	36,211	
October 22	at No. 10 Penn State		Beaver Stadium; University Park, PA (rivalry)	L 28–49	62,108	
October 29	Villanova		Mountaineer Field; Morgantown, WV	L 36–41	31,175	
November 5	No. 12 Pittsburgh		Mountaineer Field; Morgantown, WV (rivalry)	L 3–44	37,031	
November 12	Virginia Tech		Mountaineer Field; Morgantown, WV (rivalry)	W 20–14	29,041	
November 19	at Syracuse		Archbold Stadium; Syracuse, NY (rivalry)	L 9–28	16,118	
^{†}Homecoming; Rankings from AP Poll released prior to the game

== Roster ==
1977 West Virginia Mountaineers football team roster
Players
Coaches
Offense

Pos.	#	Name	Class
QB	2	Dan Kendra	Sr
WR	9	Cedric Thomas	So
QB	13	Mark Perry	So
QB	14	Doug Banda	Fr
QB	16	Danny Williams	Sr
RB	31	Robert Alexander	Fr
RB	37	Terry Bowden	Sr
FB	46	Walter Easley	So

Defense

Pos.	#	Name	Class
DB	22	Tom Pridemore	Sr

Special teams

Pos.	#	Name	Class

Head coach

- Frank Cignetti

Coordinators/assistant coaches

Legend

- (C) Team captain
- (S) Suspended
- (I) Ineligible
- Injured
- Redshirt
