= 1977 Northeast Louisiana Indians football team =

American college football season

1977 Northeast Louisiana Indians football
- Conference: Independent
- Record: 2–9
- Head coach: John David Crow (2nd season)
- Home stadium: Brown Stadium

1977 NCAA Division I independents football records
	Conf.					Overall
Team	W		L		T	W		L		T
No. 1 Notre Dame		–		–		11	–	1	–	0
No. 5 Penn State		–		–		11	–	1	–	0
Colgate		–		–		10	–	1	–	0
North Texas State *		–		–		10	–	1	–	0
No. 16 San Diego State		–		–		10	–	1	–	0
Tennessee State		–		–		8	–	1	–	1
No. 14 Florida State		–		–		10	–	2	–	0
No. 8 Pittsburgh		–		–		9	–	2	–	1
East Carolina		–		–		8	–	3	–	0
Rutgers		–		–		8	–	3	–	0
Army		–		–		7	–	4	–	0
Louisville		–		–		7	–	4	–	1
Boston College		–		–		6	–	5	–	0
Cincinnati		–		–		5	–	4	–	2
Georgia Tech		–		–		6	–	5	–	0
Memphis State		–		–		6	–	5	–	0
Northwestern State		–		–		6	–	5	–	0
Syracuse		–		–		6	–	5	–	0
William & Mary		–		–		6	–	5	–	0
Southern Miss		–		–		6	–	5	–	0
Temple		–		–		5	–	5	–	1
Hawaii		–		–		5	–	6	–	0
Navy		–		–		5	–	6	–	0
West Virginia		–		–		5	–	6	–	0
South Carolina		–		–		5	–	7	–	0
Utah State		–		–		4	–	7	–	0
Villanova		–		–		4	–	7	–	0
Illinois State		–		–		3	–	7	–	1
Virginia Tech		–		–		3	–	7	–	1
Miami (FL)		–		–		3	–	8	–	0
Richmond		–		–		3	–	8	–	0
Tulane		–		–		3	–	8	–	0
Air Force		–		–		2	–	8	–	1
Holy Cross		–		–		2	–	8	–	0
Northeast Louisiana		–		–		2	–	9	–	0
North Texas State (originally 9–2) awarded a forfeit win after Mississippi State was found to be using an ineligible player.; Rankings from AP Poll

The 1977 Northeast Louisiana Indians football team was an American football team that represented Northeast Louisiana University (now known as the University of Louisiana at Monroe) as an independent during the 1977 NCAA Division I football season. In their second year under head coach John David Crow, the team compiled a 2–9 record.

== Schedule ==
Date	Opponent	Site	Result	Attendance	Source
September 10	at Lamar	Cardinal Stadium; Beaumont, TX	L 7–21		
September 17	at Tulsa	Skelly Stadium; Tulsa, OK	L 35–37	14,306	
September 24	at Cincinnati	Nippert Stadium; Cincinnati, OH	L 0–63	13,079	
October 1	at Northwestern State	Harry Turpin Stadium; Natchitoches, LA (rivalry)	L 0–13	11,655	
October 8	Cal State Fullerton	Brown Stadium; Monroe, LA	L 10–31	6,000	
October 15	McNeese State	Brown Stadium; Monroe, LA	L 7–29		
October 22	Southeastern Louisiana	Brown Stadium; Monroe, LA	W 24–19		
October 29	Arkansas State	Brown Stadium; Monroe, LA	L 20–31		
November 5	Nicholls State	Brown Stadium; Monroe, LA	W 19–2	7,300	
November 12	at Pacific (CA)	Pacific Memorial Stadium; Stockton, CA	L 0–31		
November 24	at Louisiana Tech	Joe Aillet Stadium; Ruston, LA (rivalry)	L 0–20	9,600	
