= 1977 New Hampshire Wildcats football team =

American college football season

1977 New Hampshire Wildcats football
- Conference: Yankee Conference
- Record: 8–2 (3–2 Yankee)
- Head coach: Bill Bowes (6th season)
- Home stadium: Cowell Stadium

1977 Yankee Conference football standings
	Conf.					Overall
Team	W		L		T	W		L		T
No. 2 UMass $	5	–	0	–	0	8	–	3	–	0
Rhode Island	4	–	1	–	0	6	–	5	–	0
New Hampshire	3	–	2	–	0	8	–	2	–	0
Boston University	1	–	4	–	0	3	–	7	–	0
Maine	1	–	4	–	0	3	–	7	–	0
Connecticut	1	–	4	–	0	1	–	10	–	0
$ – Conference champion; Rankings from Associated Press poll

The 1977 New Hampshire Wildcats football team was an American football team that represented the University of New Hampshire as a member of the Yankee Conference during the 1977 NCAA Division II football season. In its sixth year under head coach Bill Bowes, the team compiled an 8–2 record (3–2 against conference opponents) and finished third out of six teams in the Yankee Conference.

== Schedule ==
Date	Opponent	Rank	Site	Result	Attendance	Source
September 10	Holy Cross*		Cowell Stadium; Durham, NH	W 27–14	11,800	
September 17	at Boston University		Nickerson Field; Boston, MA	W 26–14	4,320	
September 24	West Chester*	No. 3	Cowell Stadium; Durham, NH	W 26–0	8,200	
October 1	at Connecticut	No. 3	Memorial Stadium; Storrs, CT	W 42–7	7,578	
October 8	at Maine	No. 2	Alumni Field; Orono, ME (Battle for the Brice–Cowell Musket)	W 54–7	9,100	
October 15	Central Connecticut*	No. 2	Cowell Stadium; Durham, NH	W 42–7	6,400	
October 22	Northeastern*	No. 2	Cowell Stadium; Durham, NH	W 28–13	14,000	
October 29	at Rhode Island	No. 1	Meade Stadium; Kingston, RI	L 20–21	8,813	
November 5	at Springfield*	No. 6	Stagg Field; Springfield, MA	W 52–7	2,978	
November 12	No. 3 UMass	No. 5	Cowell Stadium; Durham, NH rivalry	L 6–19	20,000	
*Non-conference game; Rankings from AP Poll released prior to the game
