= 1977 Syracuse Orangemen football team =

American college football season

1977 Syracuse Orangemen football
- Conference: Independent
- Record: 6–5
- Head coach: Frank Maloney (4th season)
- Offensive coordinator: Tom Coughlin (2nd season)
- Defensive coordinator: Dennis Fryzel (1st season)
- Captain: Game captains
- Home stadium: Archbold Stadium

1977 NCAA Division I independents football records
	Conf.					Overall
Team	W		L		T	W		L		T
No. 1 Notre Dame		–		–		11	–	1	–	0
No. 5 Penn State		–		–		11	–	1	–	0
Colgate		–		–		10	–	1	–	0
North Texas State *		–		–		10	–	1	–	0
No. 16 San Diego State		–		–		10	–	1	–	0
Tennessee State		–		–		8	–	1	–	1
No. 14 Florida State		–		–		10	–	2	–	0
No. 8 Pittsburgh		–		–		9	–	2	–	1
East Carolina		–		–		8	–	3	–	0
Rutgers		–		–		8	–	3	–	0
Army		–		–		7	–	4	–	0
Louisville		–		–		7	–	4	–	1
Boston College		–		–		6	–	5	–	0
Cincinnati		–		–		5	–	4	–	2
Georgia Tech		–		–		6	–	5	–	0
Memphis State		–		–		6	–	5	–	0
Northwestern State		–		–		6	–	5	–	0
Syracuse		–		–		6	–	5	–	0
William & Mary		–		–		6	–	5	–	0
Southern Miss		–		–		6	–	5	–	0
Temple		–		–		5	–	5	–	1
Hawaii		–		–		5	–	6	–	0
Navy		–		–		5	–	6	–	0
West Virginia		–		–		5	–	6	–	0
South Carolina		–		–		5	–	7	–	0
Utah State		–		–		4	–	7	–	0
Villanova		–		–		4	–	7	–	0
Illinois State		–		–		3	–	7	–	1
Virginia Tech		–		–		3	–	7	–	1
Miami (FL)		–		–		3	–	8	–	0
Richmond		–		–		3	–	8	–	0
Tulane		–		–		3	–	8	–	0
Air Force		–		–		2	–	8	–	1
Holy Cross		–		–		2	–	8	–	0
Northeast Louisiana		–		–		2	–	9	–	0
North Texas State (originally 9–2) awarded a forfeit win after Mississippi State was found to be using an ineligible player.; Rankings from AP Poll

The 1977 Syracuse Orangemen football team represented Syracuse University as an independent during the 1977 NCAA Division I football season. The team was led by fourth-year head coach Frank Maloney and played their home games at Archbold Stadium in Syracuse, New York. The team finished 6–5 and was not invited to a bowl game.

Assistant coaches included Tom Coughlin, a Syracuse alum who later became head coach of the Jacksonville Jaguars and New York Giants; Jerry Angelo, future general manager of the Chicago Bears; and Nick Saban, who went on to be head coach at Michigan State, LSU and Alabama, as well as the Miami Dolphins.

== Schedule ==
Date	Opponent	Site	Result	Attendance	Source
September 10	at Oregon State	Parker Stadium; Corvallis, OR	L 12–24	20,540	
September 17	NC State	Archbold Stadium; Syracuse, NY	L 0–38	20,696	
September 24	Washington	Archbold Stadium; Syracuse, NY	W 22–20	12,839	
October 1	at Illinois	Memorial Stadium; Champaign, IL	W 30–20	52,015	
October 8	at Maryland	Byrd Stadium; College Park, MD	L 10–24	39,100	
October 15	No. 10 Penn State	Archbold Stadium; Syracuse, NY (rivalry)	L 24–31	27,029	
October 22	at No. 14 Pittsburgh	Pitt Stadium; Pittsburgh, PA (rivalry)	L 21–28	43,551	
October 29	Virginia	Archbold Stadium; Syracuse, NY	W 6–3	20,859	
November 5	at Navy	Navy–Marine Corps Memorial Stadium; Annapolis, MD	W 45–34	16,709	
November 12	Boston College	Archbold Stadium; Syracuse, NY	W 20–3	16,409	
November 19	West Virginia	Archbold Stadium; Syracuse, NY (rivalry)	W 28–9	16,118	
Rankings from AP Poll released prior to the game

== Roster ==
1977 Syracuse Orangemen football team roster
Players
Coaches
Offense

Pos.	#	Name	Class
RB	46	Bob Avery	Sr
OT	50	Bruce Babcock	Jr
OT	76	Neil Barton	Sr
C	56	Paul Colvin	Sr
WR	81	Dave Farneski	Fr
QB	10	Ron Farneski	So
RB	36	Dennis Hartman	Fr
C	54	Joe Hodges	Jr
QB	5	Bill Hurley	So
WR	80	Mike Jones	Sr
G	66	John Lally	Fr
RB	45	Art Monk	So
RB	44	Mandel Robinson	So
TE	84	Rich Rosen	Sr
TE	85	Bruce Semall	So
RB	31	Jim Sessler	Sr
QB	7	Tony Sidor	Fr
G	69	Don Wells	Sr
G	51	Glenn Williams	Jr
WR	40	Greg Williams	So
QB	9	Tim Wilson	Fr
G	64	Craig Wolfley	So

Defense

Pos.	#	Name	Class
DB	23	Joe Caruso	So
DT	71	Ken Clarke	Sr
DE	78	Gordon Grownkowski	Fr
DB	3	Warren Harvey	So
DB	19	Larry King	Sr
DE	43	John Kinley	So
DL	30	Jerry Martin	Sr
DL	55	Willie McCullough	Jr
DT	75	Guy Neugebauer	Fr
DB	24	Terry O'Leary	Jr
DB	35	John Patterson	Jr
DE	92	Chris Shaffer	So
DL	96	Bob Tate	So
DL	91	Bernie Winters	Sr
DE	88	Kevin Yard	So
LB	48	Mike Zunic	Fr

Special teams

Pos.	#	Name	Class
P	99	Joe Goodwill	Fr
K	1	Dave Jacobs	Jr

Head coach

- Frank Maloney

Coordinators/assistant coaches

- Jerry Angelo
  Tom Coughlin
  Nick Saban

Legend

- (C) Team captain
- (S) Suspended
- (I) Ineligible
- Injured
- Redshirt
