= 1977 Holy Cross Crusaders football team =

American college football season

1977 Holy Cross Crusaders football
- Conference: Independent
- Record: 2–9
- Head coach: Neil Wheelwright (2nd season)
- Captains: Craig Cerretani; Steve Hunt
- Home stadium: Fitton Field

1977 NCAA Division I independents football records
	Conf.					Overall
Team	W		L		T	W		L		T
No. 1 Notre Dame		–		–		11	–	1	–	0
No. 5 Penn State		–		–		11	–	1	–	0
Colgate		–		–		10	–	1	–	0
North Texas State *		–		–		10	–	1	–	0
No. 16 San Diego State		–		–		10	–	1	–	0
Tennessee State		–		–		8	–	1	–	1
No. 14 Florida State		–		–		10	–	2	–	0
No. 8 Pittsburgh		–		–		9	–	2	–	1
East Carolina		–		–		8	–	3	–	0
Rutgers		–		–		8	–	3	–	0
Army		–		–		7	–	4	–	0
Louisville		–		–		7	–	4	–	1
Boston College		–		–		6	–	5	–	0
Cincinnati		–		–		5	–	4	–	2
Georgia Tech		–		–		6	–	5	–	0
Memphis State		–		–		6	–	5	–	0
Northwestern State		–		–		6	–	5	–	0
Syracuse		–		–		6	–	5	–	0
William & Mary		–		–		6	–	5	–	0
Southern Miss		–		–		6	–	5	–	0
Temple		–		–		5	–	5	–	1
Hawaii		–		–		5	–	6	–	0
Navy		–		–		5	–	6	–	0
West Virginia		–		–		5	–	6	–	0
South Carolina		–		–		5	–	7	–	0
Utah State		–		–		4	–	7	–	0
Villanova		–		–		4	–	7	–	0
Illinois State		–		–		3	–	7	–	1
Virginia Tech		–		–		3	–	7	–	1
Miami (FL)		–		–		3	–	8	–	0
Richmond		–		–		3	–	8	–	0
Tulane		–		–		3	–	8	–	0
Air Force		–		–		2	–	8	–	1
Holy Cross		–		–		2	–	8	–	0
Northeast Louisiana		–		–		2	–	9	–	0
North Texas State (originally 9–2) awarded a forfeit win after Mississippi State was found to be using an ineligible player.; Rankings from AP Poll

The 1977 Holy Cross Crusaders football team was an American football team that represented the College of the Holy Cross as an independent during the 1977 NCAA Division I football season. Head coach Neil Wheelwright returned for his second year. The team compiled a record of 5–6.

All home games were played at Fitton Field on the Holy Cross campus in Worcester, Massachusetts.

== Schedule ==
Date	Opponent	Site	Result	Attendance	Source
September 10	at New Hampshire	Cowell Stadium; Durham, NH	L 14–27	11,800	
September 17	at Rhode Island	Meade Stadium; Kingston, RI	L 0–14	5,742	
September 24	at Dartmouth	Memorial Field; Hanover, NH	L 14–17	7,900	
October 8	Colgate	Fitton Field; Worcester, MA	L 14–31	10,132	
October 15	Boston University^{†}	Fitton Field; Worcester, MA	L 13–14	6,110	
October 22	Brown^	Fitton Field; Worcester, MA	L 13–44	14,000	
October 29	at Army	Michie Stadium; West Point, NY	L 7–48	41,376	
November 5	at UMass	Alumni Stadium; Hadley, MA	L 6–28	8,100	
November 12	Villanova	Fitton Field; Worcester, MA	L 0–24	7,651	
November 19	at Connecticut	Memorial Stadium; Storrs, CT	W 14–3	5,246	
November 26	Boston College	Fitton Field; Worcester, MA (rivalry)	W 35–20	12,006	
^{†}Homecoming; ^ Family Weekend

== Statistical leaders ==
Statistical leaders for the 1977 Crusaders included:

- Rushing: Crocky Nangle, 603 yards and 4 touchdowns on 148 attempts
- Passing: Peter Colombo, 508 yards, 38 completions and 2 touchdowns on 77 attempts
- Receiving: Pat Kelly, 357 yards on 26 receptions
- Scoring: Crocky Nangle, 26 points from 4 touchdowns and 1 two-point conversion
- Total offense: Peter Colombo, 610 yards (508 passing, 102 rushing)
- All-purpose yards: Larry Ewald, 923 yards (435 returning, 408 rushing, 80 receiving)
- Interceptions: Herb Mihalik, 6 interceptions for 24 yards
