= 1977 Army Cadets football team =

American college football season

1977 Army Cadets football
- Conference: Independent
- Record: 7–4
- Head coach: Homer Smith (4th season)
- Captains: Chuck D'Amico; Leamon Hall
- Home stadium: Michie Stadium

1977 NCAA Division I independents football records
	Conf.					Overall
Team	W		L		T	W		L		T
No. 1 Notre Dame		–		–		11	–	1	–	0
No. 5 Penn State		–		–		11	–	1	–	0
Colgate		–		–		10	–	1	–	0
North Texas State *		–		–		10	–	1	–	0
No. 16 San Diego State		–		–		10	–	1	–	0
Tennessee State		–		–		8	–	1	–	1
No. 14 Florida State		–		–		10	–	2	–	0
No. 8 Pittsburgh		–		–		9	–	2	–	1
East Carolina		–		–		8	–	3	–	0
Rutgers		–		–		8	–	3	–	0
Army		–		–		7	–	4	–	0
Louisville		–		–		7	–	4	–	1
Boston College		–		–		6	–	5	–	0
Cincinnati		–		–		5	–	4	–	2
Georgia Tech		–		–		6	–	5	–	0
Memphis State		–		–		6	–	5	–	0
Northwestern State		–		–		6	–	5	–	0
Syracuse		–		–		6	–	5	–	0
William & Mary		–		–		6	–	5	–	0
Southern Miss		–		–		6	–	5	–	0
Temple		–		–		5	–	5	–	1
Hawaii		–		–		5	–	6	–	0
Navy		–		–		5	–	6	–	0
West Virginia		–		–		5	–	6	–	0
South Carolina		–		–		5	–	7	–	0
Utah State		–		–		4	–	7	–	0
Villanova		–		–		4	–	7	–	0
Illinois State		–		–		3	–	7	–	1
Virginia Tech		–		–		3	–	7	–	1
Miami (FL)		–		–		3	–	8	–	0
Richmond		–		–		3	–	8	–	0
Tulane		–		–		3	–	8	–	0
Air Force		–		–		2	–	8	–	1
Holy Cross		–		–		2	–	8	–	0
Northeast Louisiana		–		–		2	–	9	–	0
North Texas State (originally 9–2) awarded a forfeit win after Mississippi State was found to be using an ineligible player.; Rankings from AP Poll

The 1977 Army Cadets represented the United States Military Academy as an independent during the 1977 NCAA Division I football season. They claimed the Commander-in-Chief's Trophy for the second straight season.

== Schedule ==
Date	Time	Opponent	Site	Result	Attendance	Source
September 10		UMass	Michie Stadium; West Point, NY	W 34–10	22,101	
September 17		VMI	Michie Stadium; West Point, NY	W 27–14	26,664	
September 24		at Boston College	Alumni Stadium; Chestnut Hill, MA	L 28–49	19,200	
October 1		No. 7 Colorado	Michie Stadium; West Point, NY	L 0–31	34,548	
October 8		Villanova	Michie Stadium; West Point, NY	W 34–32	30,618	
October 15	1:30 p.m.	vs. No. 11 Notre Dame	Giants Stadium; East Rutherford, NJ (rivalry)	L 0–24	72,594	
October 22		Lafayette	Michie Stadium; West Point, NY	W 42–6	28,277–28,322	
October 29		Holy Cross	Michie Stadium; West Point, NY	W 48–7	41,376	
November 5		at Air Force	Falcon Stadium; Colorado Springs, CO (Commander-in-Chief's Trophy)	W 31–6	34,338	
November 12	1:30 p.m.	vs. No. 10 Pittsburgh	Giants Stadium; East Rutherford, NJ	L 26–52	35,387	
November 26		vs. Navy	John F. Kennedy Stadium; Philadelphia, PA (Army–Navy Game)	W 17–14	81,091	
Rankings from AP Poll released prior to the game; All times are in Eastern time

== Game summaries ==
=== UMass ===
Army's win over UMass was the 500th in school history. Leamon Hall threw five touchdown passes, including three to freshman Mike Fahnstock.

=== Villanova ===
Team	1	2	3	4	Total
Villanova	14	0	0	18	32
• Army	0	7	7	20	34

- Date: October 8
- Location: Michie Stadium • West Point, New York

Scoring summary
1	VILL	Poleo 1-yard run (Fernandez kick)	Villanova 7-0
1	VILL	Thompson 2-yard run (Fernandez kick)	Villanova 14-0
2	ARMY	Hall 5-yard run (Castelli kick)	Villanova 14-7
3	ARMY	McGlasker 18-yard pass from Hall (Castelli kick)	Tie 14-14
4	ARMY	Brundidge 5-yard pass from Hall (Castelli kick)	Army 21-14
4	VILL	Thompson 1-yard run (Fernandez kick)	Tie 21-21
4	VILL	Fernandez 27-yard field goal	Villanova 24-21
4	ARMY	Hall 2-yard run (Castelli kick)	Army 28-24
4	ARMY	Dwyer 26-yard run (kick failed)	Army 34-24
4	VILL	McCauley 17-yard pass from O'Brien (Hobar pass from O'Brien)	Army 34-32

=== Navy ===
Army vs. Navy

Team	1	2	3	4	Total
Navy	0	7	7	0	14
• Army	7	10	0	0	17

- Date: November 26
- Location: JFK Stadium, Philadelphia
- Game attendance: 81,091

Scoring summary
1		ARMY	Leamon Hall 1-yard run (Mike Castelli kick)	Army 7-0
2		ARMY	Mike Castelli 27-yard field goal	Army 10-0
2		NAVY	John Kurowski 18-yard pass from Bob Leszcynski (Bob Tata kick)	Army 10-7
3	1:09	ARMY	Greg King 1-yard run (Mike Castelli kick)	Army 17-7
3		NAVY	Joe Gattuso Jr. 2-yard run (Bob Tata kick)	Army 17-14

Army finished with its first winning season since 1972.

== Roster ==
1977 Army Cadets football team roster
Players
Coaches
Offense

Pos.	#	Name	Class
TE	82	Clennie Brundidge	Jr
OL	71	Tony Dailey	Sr
OL	67	Curt Downs	Sr
WR	47	George Dunaway	Sr
RB	37	Jon Dwyer	So
WR	88	Mike Fahnstock	Fr
QB	16	Leamon Hall (C)	Sr
OL	63	Jim Hodge	Sr
OL	77	Jim Hollingsworth	Sr
OL	57	Chuck Johnston	Jr
RB	43	Greg King	Sr
RB	32	Tony Landry
WR	11	Greg McGlasker	Sr
RB	40	Jim Merriken	Jr
QB	10	Earle Mulrane	So
OL	78	Joe Oliver	Jr
RB		Dave Pritchard
WR	29	Bill Skoda	So
TE	22	Ward Whyte	Jr
TE	85	Keith Wilson	Sr

Defense

Pos.	#	Name	Class
DE	64	Mark Berry	Sr
DB	18	Dave Charest
DB	25	Ed Clemons
DT	72	Chuck D'Amico (C)	Sr
DB	33	Bruce Elliott
DL		Stan Ford	Sr
DL		Duane Fuller
DL	74	Bob Groller	Jr
DL		Tom Hayden
LB	80	John Hillard
DB	20	Joe LeGasse	Jr
DB		Doug Lowery
DB	34	Phil Macklin	Jr
DL	55	George Mayes	Fr
LB	53	Steve Miller	Sr
DL	84	Chuck Schott	Jr
DL	91	Tiki Traylor	Jr
DL	69	Doug Turrell	Jr
LB	58	Kirk Thomas	Jr
DB	24	Dan Webb

Special teams

Pos.	#	Name	Class
K	39	Mike Castelli	Sr

Head coach

- Homer Smith

Coordinators/assistant coaches

Legend

- (C) Team captain
- (S) Suspended
- (I) Ineligible
- Injured
- Redshirt

== Awards ==
- Homer Smith – Eastern Coach of the Year (New York Football Writers Association)

== Stats ==
- QB Leamon Hall – 151/265 for 1,944 yards with 15 TD vs 17 INT
- RB Greg King – 177 carries for 961 yards with 7 TD
- RB Jim Merriken – 99 carries for 447 yards with 4 TD. 35 catches for 350 yards with 2 TD
- TE Clennie Brundridge – 51 catches for 842 yards with 4 TD
