= 1977 Maine Black Bears football team =

American college football season

1977 Maine Black Bears football
- Conference: Yankee Conference
- Record: 3–7 (1–4 Yankee)
- Head coach: Jack Bicknell (2nd season)
- Captains: Jack Cosgrove; David Secin
- Home stadium: Alumni Field

1977 Yankee Conference football standings
	Conf.					Overall
Team	W		L		T	W		L		T
No. 2 UMass $	5	–	0	–	0	8	–	3	–	0
Rhode Island	4	–	1	–	0	6	–	5	–	0
New Hampshire	3	–	2	–	0	8	–	2	–	0
Boston University	1	–	4	–	0	3	–	7	–	0
Maine	1	–	4	–	0	3	–	7	–	0
Connecticut	1	–	4	–	0	1	–	10	–	0
$ – Conference champion; Rankings from Associated Press poll

The 1977 Maine Black Bears football team was an American football team that represented the University of Maine as a member of the Yankee Conference during the 1977 NCAA Division II football season. In its second season under head coach Jack Bicknell, the team compiled a 3–7 record (1–4 against conference opponents) and tied for last place in the Yankee Conference. Jack Cosgrove and David Secin were the team captains.

== Schedule ==
Date	Opponent	Site	Result	Attendance	Source
September 10	at Lafayette*	Fisher Field; Easton, PA	W 12–10	4,200–4,328	
September 17	at UMass	Alumni Stadium; Hadley, MA	L 0–28	8,400	
September 24	Central Connecticut State*	Alumni Field; Orono, ME	W 45–20	4,900	
October 1	at Rhode Island	Meade Stadium; Kingston, RI	L 0–28	7,300–8,457	
October 8	New Hampshire	Alumni Field; Orono, ME	L 7–54	9,100	
October 15	Connecticut	Alumni Field; Orono, ME	W 9–7	3,200	
October 22	at Western Carolina*	E. J. Whitmire Stadium; Cullowhee, NC	L 20–41	6,500	
October 29	Albany*	Alumni Field; Orono, ME	L 39–42	4,300	
November 5	at Northeastern*	Parsons Field; Brookline, MA	L 20–47	4,300	
November 12	Boston University	Alumni Field; Orono, ME	L 20–23	4,100	
*Non-conference game
