= 1977 UMass Minutemen football team =

American college football season

1977 UMass Minutemen football

Yankee Conference champion

NCAA Division II Quarterfinal, L 23–30 vs. Lehigh
- Conference: Yankee Conference

Ranking
- AP: No. 2
- Record: 8–3 (5–0 Yankee)
- Head coach: Dick MacPherson (7th season)
- Home stadium: Alumni Stadium

1977 Yankee Conference football standings
	Conf.					Overall
Team	W		L		T	W		L		T
No. 2 UMass $	5	–	0	–	0	8	–	3	–	0
Rhode Island	4	–	1	–	0	6	–	5	–	0
New Hampshire	3	–	2	–	0	8	–	2	–	0
Boston University	1	–	4	–	0	3	–	7	–	0
Maine	1	–	4	–	0	3	–	7	–	0
Connecticut	1	–	4	–	0	1	–	10	–	0
$ – Conference champion; Rankings from Associated Press poll

The 1977 UMass Minutemen football team represented the University of Massachusetts Amherst as a member of the Yankee Conference during the 1977 NCAA Division II football season. Led by Dick MacPherson in his seventh and final season as head coach, the Minutemen compiled an overall record of 8–3 with a mark of 5–0 in conference play, winning the Yankee Conference title. UMass advanced to the NCAA Division II Football Championship playoffs, losing in the quarterfinals to the eventual national champion, Lehigh. The team played home games at Alumni Stadium in Hadley, Massachusetts.

The 1977 season was the last in which UMass competed at the NCAA Division II level, as the Yankee Conference moved to the NCAA's newly-formed Division I-AA—now known at the Football Championship Subdivision (FCS)—in 1978.

== Schedule ==
Date	Opponent	Rank	Site	Result	Attendance	Source
September 10	Army*		Michie Stadium; West Point, NY	L 10–34	22,101	
September 17	Maine		Alumni Stadium; Hadley, MA	W 28–0	8,400	
September 24	at Harvard*		Harvard Stadium; Boston, MA	W 17–0	9,000–10,116	
October 1	Youngstown State*	No. 10	Alumni Stadium; Hadley, MA	W 54–13	7,200	
October 8	Boston University	No. 8	Alumni Stadium; Hadley, MA	W 41–16	4,700	
October 15	Rhode Island	No. 7	Alumni Stadium; Hadley, MA	W 37–6	10,500	
October 28	at Connecticut	No. 6	Memorial Stadium; Storrs, CT (rivalry)	W 10–0	7,122	
November 5	Holy Cross*	No. T–3	Alumni Stadium; Hadley, MA	W 28–6	8,100	
November 12	at No. 5 New Hampshire	No. 3	Cowell Stadium; Durham, NH (rivalry)	W 19–6	20,000	
November 19	at Boston College*	No. 2	Alumni Stadium; Chestnut Hill, MA (rivalry)	L 7–34	30,846	
November 26	No. 8 Lehigh*	No. 2	Alumni Stadium; Hadley, MA (NCAA Division II Quarterfinal)	L 23–30	4,964–5,700	
*Non-conference game; Rankings from AP Poll released prior to the game
