= 1977 Georgia Tech Yellow Jackets football team =

American college football season

1977 Georgia Tech Yellow Jackets football
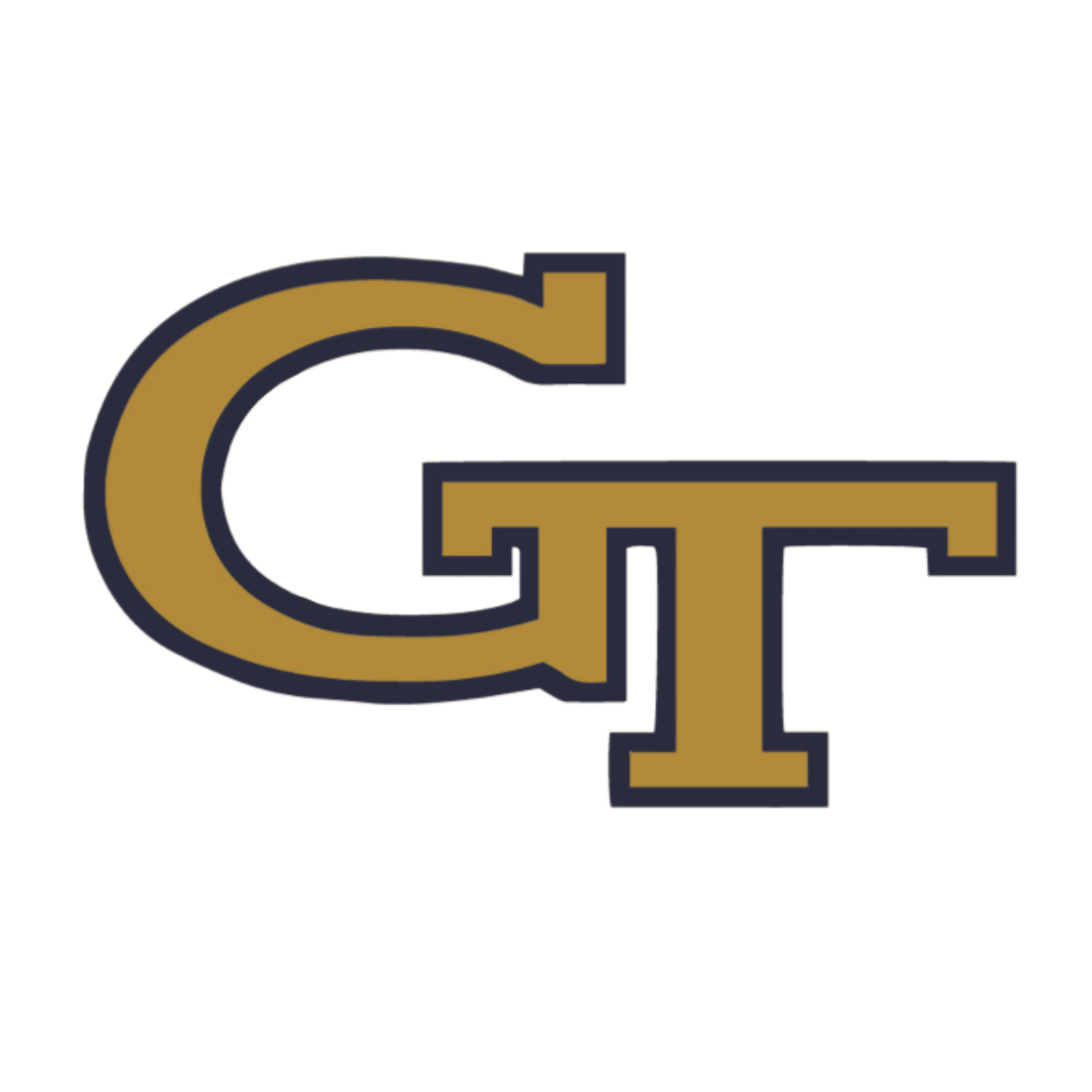
- Conference: Independent
- Record: 6–5
- Head coach: Pepper Rodgers (4th season)
- Captains: Lucius Sanford; Randy Pass; Freeman Colbert; Lawton Hydrick
- Home stadium: Grant Field

1977 NCAA Division I independents football records
	Conf.					Overall
Team	W		L		T	W		L		T
No. 1 Notre Dame		–		–		11	–	1	–	0
No. 5 Penn State		–		–		11	–	1	–	0
Colgate		–		–		10	–	1	–	0
North Texas State *		–		–		10	–	1	–	0
No. 16 San Diego State		–		–		10	–	1	–	0
Tennessee State		–		–		8	–	1	–	1
No. 14 Florida State		–		–		10	–	2	–	0
No. 8 Pittsburgh		–		–		9	–	2	–	1
East Carolina		–		–		8	–	3	–	0
Rutgers		–		–		8	–	3	–	0
Army		–		–		7	–	4	–	0
Louisville		–		–		7	–	4	–	1
Boston College		–		–		6	–	5	–	0
Cincinnati		–		–		5	–	4	–	2
Georgia Tech		–		–		6	–	5	–	0
Memphis State		–		–		6	–	5	–	0
Northwestern State		–		–		6	–	5	–	0
Syracuse		–		–		6	–	5	–	0
William & Mary		–		–		6	–	5	–	0
Southern Miss		–		–		6	–	5	–	0
Temple		–		–		5	–	5	–	1
Hawaii		–		–		5	–	6	–	0
Navy		–		–		5	–	6	–	0
West Virginia		–		–		5	–	6	–	0
South Carolina		–		–		5	–	7	–	0
Utah State		–		–		4	–	7	–	0
Villanova		–		–		4	–	7	–	0
Illinois State		–		–		3	–	7	–	1
Virginia Tech		–		–		3	–	7	–	1
Miami (FL)		–		–		3	–	8	–	0
Richmond		–		–		3	–	8	–	0
Tulane		–		–		3	–	8	–	0
Air Force		–		–		2	–	8	–	1
Holy Cross		–		–		2	–	8	–	0
Northeast Louisiana		–		–		2	–	9	–	0
North Texas State (originally 9–2) awarded a forfeit win after Mississippi State was found to be using an ineligible player.; Rankings from AP Poll

The 1977 Georgia Tech Yellow Jackets football team represented the Georgia Institute of Technology as an independent during the 1977 NCAA Division I football season. The Yellow Jackets were led by fourth-year head coach Pepper Rodgers, and played their home games at Grant Field in Atlanta.

== Schedule ==
Date	Opponent	Site	Result	Attendance	Source
September 10	at South Carolina	Williams–Brice Stadium; Columbia, SC	L 0–17	55,934	
September 17	Miami (FL)	Grant Field; Atlanta, GA	W 10–6	31,916	
September 24	at Clemson	Memorial Stadium; Clemson, SC (rivalry)	L 14–31	50,116	
October 1	Air Force	Grant Field; Atlanta, GA	W 30–3	30,067	
October 8	at Tennessee	Neyland Stadium; Knoxville, TN (rivalry)	W 24–8	82,631	
October 15	Auburn	Grant Field; Atlanta, GA (rivalry)	W 38–21	54,961	
October 22	at Tulane	Louisiana Superdome; New Orleans, LA	W 38–14	28,345	
October 29	Duke^{†}	Grant Field; Atlanta, GA	L 24–25	47,131	
November 5	at No. 5 Notre Dame	Notre Dame Stadium; Notre Dame, IN (rivalry)	L 14–69	59,075	
November 12	at Navy	Navy–Marine Corps Memorial Stadium; Annapolis, MD	L 16–20	18,590	
November 26	Georgia	Grant Field; Atlanta, GA (Clean, Old-Fashioned Hate)	W 16–7	60,104	
^{†}Homecoming; Rankings from AP Poll released prior to the game

== Roster ==
- Freeman Colbert
- PK Mike Dassel
- Drew Hill
- QB Gary Lanier
- Reggie Wilkes
- Randy Pass
