= 1977 East Carolina Pirates football team =

American college football season

1977 East Carolina Pirates football
- Conference: Independent
- Record: 8–3
- Head coach: Pat Dye (4th season)
- Home stadium: Ficklen Memorial Stadium

1977 NCAA Division I independents football records
	Conf.					Overall
Team	W		L		T	W		L		T
No. 1 Notre Dame		–		–		11	–	1	–	0
No. 5 Penn State		–		–		11	–	1	–	0
Colgate		–		–		10	–	1	–	0
North Texas State *		–		–		10	–	1	–	0
No. 16 San Diego State		–		–		10	–	1	–	0
Tennessee State		–		–		8	–	1	–	1
No. 14 Florida State		–		–		10	–	2	–	0
No. 8 Pittsburgh		–		–		9	–	2	–	1
East Carolina		–		–		8	–	3	–	0
Rutgers		–		–		8	–	3	–	0
Army		–		–		7	–	4	–	0
Louisville		–		–		7	–	4	–	1
Boston College		–		–		6	–	5	–	0
Cincinnati		–		–		5	–	4	–	2
Georgia Tech		–		–		6	–	5	–	0
Memphis State		–		–		6	–	5	–	0
Northwestern State		–		–		6	–	5	–	0
Syracuse		–		–		6	–	5	–	0
William & Mary		–		–		6	–	5	–	0
Southern Miss		–		–		6	–	5	–	0
Temple		–		–		5	–	5	–	1
Hawaii		–		–		5	–	6	–	0
Navy		–		–		5	–	6	–	0
West Virginia		–		–		5	–	6	–	0
South Carolina		–		–		5	–	7	–	0
Utah State		–		–		4	–	7	–	0
Villanova		–		–		4	–	7	–	0
Illinois State		–		–		3	–	7	–	1
Virginia Tech		–		–		3	–	7	–	1
Miami (FL)		–		–		3	–	8	–	0
Richmond		–		–		3	–	8	–	0
Tulane		–		–		3	–	8	–	0
Air Force		–		–		2	–	8	–	1
Holy Cross		–		–		2	–	8	–	0
Northeast Louisiana		–		–		2	–	9	–	0
North Texas State (originally 9–2) awarded a forfeit win after Mississippi State was found to be using an ineligible player.; Rankings from AP Poll

The 1977 East Carolina Pirates football team was an American football team that represented East Carolina University as an independent during the 1977 NCAA Division I football season. In their fourth season under head coach Pat Dye, the team compiled a 8–3 record.

== Schedule ==
Date	Opponent	Site	Result	Attendance	Source
September 3	at NC State	Carter Stadium; Raleigh, NC (rivalry)	W 28–23	49,200	
September 10	at Duke	Wallace Wade Stadium; Durham, NC	W 17–16	38,200	
September 17	at Toledo	Glass Bowl; Toledo, OH	W 22–9	12,127	
September 24	VMI	Ficklen Memorial Stadium; Greenville, NC	W 14–13	23,581	
October 1	at South Carolina	Williams–Brice Stadium; Columbia, SC	L 16–19	52,813	
October 8	Southern Illinois	Ficklen Memorial Stadium; Greenville, NC	W 33–0	25,251	
October 15	Richmond	Ficklen Memorial Stadium; Greenville, NC	W 35–14	19,010	
October 22	at The Citadel	Johnson Hagood Stadium; Charleston, SC	W 34–16	13,520	
October 29	Southwestern Louisiana	Ficklen Memorial Stadium; Greenville, NC	L 7–9	16,662	
November 5	at Appalachian State	Conrad Stadium; Boone, NC	W 45–14	10,419	
November 12	vs. William & Mary	Foreman Field; Norfolk, VA (Oyster Bowl)	L 17–21	20,863	
