= 1977 San Diego State Aztecs football team =

American college football season

1977 San Diego State Aztecs football
- Conference: Independent

Ranking
- Coaches: No. 19
- AP: No. 16
- Record: 10–1
- Head coach: Claude Gilbert (5th season)
- Offensive coordinator: Ted Tollner (5th season)
- Offensive scheme: Pro-style
- Base defense: 4–3
- Home stadium: San Diego Stadium

1977 NCAA Division I independents football records
	Conf.					Overall
Team	W		L		T	W		L		T
No. 1 Notre Dame		–		–		11	–	1	–	0
No. 5 Penn State		–		–		11	–	1	–	0
Colgate		–		–		10	–	1	–	0
North Texas State *		–		–		10	–	1	–	0
No. 16 San Diego State		–		–		10	–	1	–	0
Tennessee State		–		–		8	–	1	–	1
No. 14 Florida State		–		–		10	–	2	–	0
No. 8 Pittsburgh		–		–		9	–	2	–	1
East Carolina		–		–		8	–	3	–	0
Rutgers		–		–		8	–	3	–	0
Army		–		–		7	–	4	–	0
Louisville		–		–		7	–	4	–	1
Boston College		–		–		6	–	5	–	0
Cincinnati		–		–		5	–	4	–	2
Georgia Tech		–		–		6	–	5	–	0
Memphis State		–		–		6	–	5	–	0
Northwestern State		–		–		6	–	5	–	0
Syracuse		–		–		6	–	5	–	0
William & Mary		–		–		6	–	5	–	0
Southern Miss		–		–		6	–	5	–	0
Temple		–		–		5	–	5	–	1
Hawaii		–		–		5	–	6	–	0
Navy		–		–		5	–	6	–	0
West Virginia		–		–		5	–	6	–	0
South Carolina		–		–		5	–	7	–	0
Utah State		–		–		4	–	7	–	0
Villanova		–		–		4	–	7	–	0
Illinois State		–		–		3	–	7	–	1
Virginia Tech		–		–		3	–	7	–	1
Miami (FL)		–		–		3	–	8	–	0
Richmond		–		–		3	–	8	–	0
Tulane		–		–		3	–	8	–	0
Air Force		–		–		2	–	8	–	1
Holy Cross		–		–		2	–	8	–	0
Northeast Louisiana		–		–		2	–	9	–	0
North Texas State (originally 9–2) awarded a forfeit win after Mississippi State was found to be using an ineligible player.; Rankings from AP Poll

The 1977 San Diego State Aztecs football team represented San Diego State University during the 1977 NCAA Division I football season as an independent.

The team was led by head coach Claude Gilbert, in his fifth year, and played home games at San Diego Stadium (Note: San Diego County Credit Union Stadium (SDCCU Stadium) was known as San Diego Stadium from its opening in 1967 through 1980.) in San Diego, California. They finished the season ranked #16 in the AP Poll and #18 in the UPI Poll, with a record of ten wins and one loss (10–1).

== Schedule ==
Date	Opponent	Rank	Site	Result	Attendance	Source
September 10	Cal State Fullerton		San Diego Stadium; San Diego, CA	W 34–17	41,066	
September 17	at Arizona		Arizona Stadium; Tucson, AZ	W 21–14	42,135	
October 1	Utah State		San Diego Stadium; San Diego	W 19–0	43,161	
October 8	at Fresno State		Ratcliffe Stadium; Fresno, CA (rivalry)	L 14–34	14,114–15,179	
October 15	UTEP		San Diego Stadium; San Diego, CA	W 49–7	34,760	
October 22	UNLV		San Diego Stadium; San Diego, CA	W 31–7	39,109	
October 29	Tulsa^{†}		San Diego Stadium; San Diego, CA	W 41–7	28,306	
November 5	at Pacific (CA)		Pacific Memorial Stadium; Stockton, CA	W 29–7	9,857	
November 12	Long Beach State		San Diego Stadium; San Diego, CA	W 33–22	37,213	
November 19	No. 13 Florida State		San Diego Stadium; San Diego, CA	W 41–16	50,453	
December 3	at San Jose State	No. 16	Spartan Stadium; San Jose, CA	W 37–34	10,000	
^{†}Homecoming; Rankings from AP Poll released prior to the game

== Team players in the NFL ==
The following were selected in the 1978 NFL draft.

Player	Position	Round	Overall	NFL team
Deacon Turner	Running back	2	45	Cincinnati Bengals
Ron Smith	Wide receiver	2	53	Los Angeles Rams
Whip Walton	Linebacker	3	75	Minnesota Vikings
Mike Douglass	Linebacker	5	116	Green Bay Packers
Terry Jackson	Defensive back	5	120	New York Giants
Dennis Pearson	Wide receiver	5	125	Atlanta Falcons

== Team awards ==
Award	Player
Most Valuable Player (John Simcox Memorial Trophy)	Deacon Turner
Outstanding Offensive & Defensive Linemen (Byron H. Chase Memorial Trophy)	Scott Bradley, Off; Ed Imo, Def
Team captains Dr. R. Hardy / C.E. Peterson Memorial Trophy	Joe Davis, Off; Whip Walton, Def
Most Inspirational Player	Tim Delaney, Ed Imo
