= 1977 William & Mary Indians football team =

American college football season

1977 William & Mary Indians football
- Conference: Independent
- Record: 7–4
- Head coach: Jim Root (6th season)
- Captains: Joe Agee; Keith Fimian
- Home stadium: Cary Field

1977 NCAA Division I independents football records
	Conf.					Overall
Team	W		L		T	W		L		T
No. 1 Notre Dame		–		–		11	–	1	–	0
No. 5 Penn State		–		–		11	–	1	–	0
Colgate		–		–		10	–	1	–	0
North Texas State *		–		–		10	–	1	–	0
No. 16 San Diego State		–		–		10	–	1	–	0
Tennessee State		–		–		8	–	1	–	1
No. 14 Florida State		–		–		10	–	2	–	0
No. 8 Pittsburgh		–		–		9	–	2	–	1
East Carolina		–		–		8	–	3	–	0
Rutgers		–		–		8	–	3	–	0
Army		–		–		7	–	4	–	0
Louisville		–		–		7	–	4	–	1
Boston College		–		–		6	–	5	–	0
Cincinnati		–		–		5	–	4	–	2
Georgia Tech		–		–		6	–	5	–	0
Memphis State		–		–		6	–	5	–	0
Northwestern State		–		–		6	–	5	–	0
Syracuse		–		–		6	–	5	–	0
William & Mary		–		–		6	–	5	–	0
Southern Miss		–		–		6	–	5	–	0
Temple		–		–		5	–	5	–	1
Hawaii		–		–		5	–	6	–	0
Navy		–		–		5	–	6	–	0
West Virginia		–		–		5	–	6	–	0
South Carolina		–		–		5	–	7	–	0
Utah State		–		–		4	–	7	–	0
Villanova		–		–		4	–	7	–	0
Illinois State		–		–		3	–	7	–	1
Virginia Tech		–		–		3	–	7	–	1
Miami (FL)		–		–		3	–	8	–	0
Richmond		–		–		3	–	8	–	0
Tulane		–		–		3	–	8	–	0
Air Force		–		–		2	–	8	–	1
Holy Cross		–		–		2	–	8	–	0
Northeast Louisiana		–		–		2	–	9	–	0
North Texas State (originally 9–2) awarded a forfeit win after Mississippi State was found to be using an ineligible player.; Rankings from AP Poll

The 1977 William & Mary Indians football team represented the College of William & Mary as an independent during the 1977 NCAA Division I football season. Led by Jim Root in his sixth year as head coach, William & Mary finished the season with a record of 6–5.

== Schedule ==
Date	Opponent	Site	Result	Attendance	Source
September 3	Norfolk State	Cary Field; Williamsburg, VA	W 27–13	16,000	
September 10	at VMI	Alumni Memorial Field; Lexington, VA (rivalry)	L 13–23	8,100	
September 17	at No. 16 Pittsburgh	Pitt Stadium; Pittsburgh, PA	L 6–28	39,646	
September 24	at Louisville	Cardinal Stadium; Louisville, KY	W 21–7	20,571	
October 1	Villanova	Cary Field; Williamsburg, VA	W 28–8	12,500	
October 8	vs. Virginia Tech	City Stadium; Richmond, VA (Tobacco Bowl)	L 8–17	18,698	
October 22	at Navy	Navy–Marine Corps Memorial Stadium; Annapolis, MD	L 17–42	22,026	
October 29	Rutgers	Cary Field; Williamsburg, VA	L 21–22	14,800	
November 5	at The Citadel	Johnson Hagood Stadium; Charleston, SC	W 14–13	13,420	
November 12	vs. East Carolina	Foreman Field; Norfolk, VA (Oyster Bowl)	W 21–17	20,863	
November 19	Richmond	Cary Field; Williamsburg, VA (rivalry)	W 29–13	14,000	
Rankings from AP Poll released prior to the game

== Game summaries ==
=== East Carolina / "12th Man Tackle" ===
On November 12, William & Mary met heavily favored East Carolina in the Oyster Bowl. In the third quarter East Carolina led by three points. With 3:15 left in the third quarter, William & Mary quarterback Tom Rozantz broke loose and ran for the end zone. Jim Johnson, a former head coach for the East Carolina football team, who was described by The Virginian Pilot as "a portly 65-year-old gentleman in a raincoat", ran from the sidelines and threw a block tackle on Rozantz before he could score the winning touchdown. The unusual turn of events silenced the screaming William & Mary fans, and the officials gathered to discuss their course of action. After deliberation, the play was ruled a touchdown and William & Mary went on to win, 21–17.
