= 1977 Navy Midshipmen football team =

American college football season

1977 Navy Midshipmen football
- Conference: Independent
- Record: 5–6
- Head coach: George Welsh (5th season)
- Captains: Joe Gattuso; Mike Galpin
- Home stadium: Navy–Marine Corps Memorial Stadium

1977 NCAA Division I independents football records
	Conf.					Overall
Team	W		L		T	W		L		T
No. 1 Notre Dame		–		–		11	–	1	–	0
No. 5 Penn State		–		–		11	–	1	–	0
Colgate		–		–		10	–	1	–	0
North Texas State *		–		–		10	–	1	–	0
No. 16 San Diego State		–		–		10	–	1	–	0
Tennessee State		–		–		8	–	1	–	1
No. 14 Florida State		–		–		10	–	2	–	0
No. 8 Pittsburgh		–		–		9	–	2	–	1
East Carolina		–		–		8	–	3	–	0
Rutgers		–		–		8	–	3	–	0
Army		–		–		7	–	4	–	0
Louisville		–		–		7	–	4	–	1
Boston College		–		–		6	–	5	–	0
Cincinnati		–		–		5	–	4	–	2
Georgia Tech		–		–		6	–	5	–	0
Memphis State		–		–		6	–	5	–	0
Northwestern State		–		–		6	–	5	–	0
Syracuse		–		–		6	–	5	–	0
William & Mary		–		–		6	–	5	–	0
Southern Miss		–		–		6	–	5	–	0
Temple		–		–		5	–	5	–	1
Hawaii		–		–		5	–	6	–	0
Navy		–		–		5	–	6	–	0
West Virginia		–		–		5	–	6	–	0
South Carolina		–		–		5	–	7	–	0
Utah State		–		–		4	–	7	–	0
Villanova		–		–		4	–	7	–	0
Illinois State		–		–		3	–	7	–	1
Virginia Tech		–		–		3	–	7	–	1
Miami (FL)		–		–		3	–	8	–	0
Richmond		–		–		3	–	8	–	0
Tulane		–		–		3	–	8	–	0
Air Force		–		–		2	–	8	–	1
Holy Cross		–		–		2	–	8	–	0
Northeast Louisiana		–		–		2	–	9	–	0
North Texas State (originally 9–2) awarded a forfeit win after Mississippi State was found to be using an ineligible player.; Rankings from AP Poll

The 1977 Navy Midshipmen football team represented the United States Naval Academy (USNA) as an independent during the 1977 NCAA Division I football season. The team was led by fifth-year head coach George Welsh.

== Schedule ==
Date	Opponent	Site	Result	Attendance	Source
September 10	The Citadel	Navy–Marine Corps Memorial Stadium; Annapolis, MD	W 21–2	16,226	
September 17	Connecticut	Navy–Marine Corps Memorial Stadium; Annapolis, MD	W 38–7	13,659	
September 24	at No. 1 Michigan	Michigan Stadium; Ann Arbor, MI	L 7–14	101,800	
October 1	at Duke	Wallace Wade Stadium; Durham, NC	L 16–28	24,800	
October 8	Air Force	Navy–Marine Corps Memorial Stadium; Annapolis, MD (Commander-in-Chief's Trophy)	W 10–7	30,030	
October 15	at No. 17 Pittsburgh	Pitt Stadium; Pittsburgh, PA	L 17–34	45,397	
October 22	William & Mary^{†}	Navy–Marine Corps Memorial Stadium; Annapolis, MD	W 42–17	22,026	
October 29	at No. 5 Notre Dame	Notre Dame Stadium; Notre Dame, IN (rivalry)	L 10–43	59,075	
November 5	Syracuse	Navy–Marine Corps Memorial Stadium; Annapolis, MD	L 34–45	16,709	
November 12	Georgia Tech	Navy–Marine Corps Memorial Stadium; Annapolis, MD	W 20–16	18,590	
November 26	vs. Army	John F. Kennedy Stadium; Philadelphia, PA (Army–Navy Game)	L 14–17	81,091	
^{†}Homecoming; Rankings from AP Poll released prior to the game

== Game summaries ==
Air Force Falcons at Navy Midshipmen

Quarter	1	2	3	4	Total
Air Force	0	7	0	0	7
Navy	0	7	0	3	10

at Navy–Marine Corps Memorial Stadium • Annapolis, Maryland

- Date: October 8
- Game weather: Rain

Game information

Air Force

Navy

- Joe Gattuso Jr. 143 Rush Yds

Scoring summary

Quarter	Time	Drive			Team	Scoring information	Score	
Quarter	Time	Plays	Yards	TOP	Team	Scoring information	AFA	NAVY
2		4			Air Force	Paul Williams 6-yard touchdown reception from Dave Ziebart, Terry Harris kick good	7	0
2			88		Navy	Paul Klawinski 5-yard touchdown run, Bob Tata kick good	7	7
4	0:41				Navy	25-yard field goal by Bob Tata	7	10
"TOP" = time of possession. For other American football terms, see Glossary of American football.							7	10

== Roster ==
1977 Navy Midshipmen football team roster
Players
Coaches
Offense

Pos.	#	Name	Class
OT	65	Jerome Barker	So
G	77	Rick Bott	So
RB		Steve Callahan
TE		Rich Cellon
QB		Randy Farley
G	62	Tom Fieldman	So
C		Ray Fritsch
RB		Joe Gattuso (C)	Sr
TE	83	Carl Hendershot	So
WR		Sandy Jones
FB	33	Larry Klawinski	So
G		Steve Kremer
WR		John Kurkowski
QB	15	Bob Lesczynski	Jr
OT	69	Jim Lippard
WR	80	Phil McConkey	Jr
RB		Leon Miller
OT	71	Mark Poston	Sr
QB	18	Bob Powers	So
OT	75	Kevin Ryan	Sr
RB	23	Mike Sherlock	Fr
OT	61	John Taylor	So
RB		Dave Walker

Defense

Pos.	#	Name	Class
DT	73	Steve Chambers	Fr
LB		Bob DeStefany
S		Mike Galpin (C)	Sr
LB	63	Mike Kronzer	Fr
DB	32	Pat McCormick	Sr
DT	76	John Merrill	So
DB	66	Charlie Meyers	So
DL		A.B. Miller
DB	49	Gregg Milo	So
DE	88	Hugh Nixon	So
LB	55	Tom Paulk	So
DL		Pfunandre Redvict
DL		Ed Reid
DB		John Sturges
DE	84	Charlie Thornton	So
DL		Tom Thompson
DB		Bob Wilson
DB	36	Chuck Zingler	So

Special teams

Pos.	#	Name	Class
K	10	Bob Tata	Jr

Head coach

- George Welsh

Coordinators/assistant coaches

Legend

- (C) Team captain
- (S) Suspended
- (I) Ineligible
- Injured
- Redshirt
