= 1977 Rutgers Scarlet Knights football team =

American college football season

1977 Rutgers Scarlet Knights football
- Conference: Independent
- Record: 8–3
- Head coach: Frank R. Burns (5th season)
- Offensive coordinator: Bill Speranza (1st season)
- Defensive coordinator: Bob Naso (10h season)
- Home stadium: Rutgers Stadium; Giants Stadium

1977 NCAA Division I independents football records
	Conf.					Overall
Team	W		L		T	W		L		T
No. 1 Notre Dame		–		–		11	–	1	–	0
No. 5 Penn State		–		–		11	–	1	–	0
Colgate		–		–		10	–	1	–	0
North Texas State *		–		–		10	–	1	–	0
No. 16 San Diego State		–		–		10	–	1	–	0
Tennessee State		–		–		8	–	1	–	1
No. 14 Florida State		–		–		10	–	2	–	0
No. 8 Pittsburgh		–		–		9	–	2	–	1
East Carolina		–		–		8	–	3	–	0
Rutgers		–		–		8	–	3	–	0
Army		–		–		7	–	4	–	0
Louisville		–		–		7	–	4	–	1
Boston College		–		–		6	–	5	–	0
Cincinnati		–		–		5	–	4	–	2
Georgia Tech		–		–		6	–	5	–	0
Memphis State		–		–		6	–	5	–	0
Northwestern State		–		–		6	–	5	–	0
Syracuse		–		–		6	–	5	–	0
William & Mary		–		–		6	–	5	–	0
Southern Miss		–		–		6	–	5	–	0
Temple		–		–		5	–	5	–	1
Hawaii		–		–		5	–	6	–	0
Navy		–		–		5	–	6	–	0
West Virginia		–		–		5	–	6	–	0
South Carolina		–		–		5	–	7	–	0
Utah State		–		–		4	–	7	–	0
Villanova		–		–		4	–	7	–	0
Illinois State		–		–		3	–	7	–	1
Virginia Tech		–		–		3	–	7	–	1
Miami (FL)		–		–		3	–	8	–	0
Richmond		–		–		3	–	8	–	0
Tulane		–		–		3	–	8	–	0
Air Force		–		–		2	–	8	–	1
Holy Cross		–		–		2	–	8	–	0
Northeast Louisiana		–		–		2	–	9	–	0
North Texas State (originally 9–2) awarded a forfeit win after Mississippi State was found to be using an ineligible player.; Rankings from AP Poll

The 1977 Rutgers Scarlet Knights football team represented Rutgers University as an independent during the 1977 NCAA Division I football season. In their fifth season under head coach Frank R. Burns, the Scarlet Knights compiled an 8-3 record while competing as an independent. The team outscored its opponents 291 to 181. The team's statistical leaders included Bret Kosup with 1,445 passing yards, Glen Kehler with 866 rushing yards, and George Carter with 391 receiving yards.

== Schedule ==
Date	Opponent	Site	Result	Attendance	Source
September 2	Penn State	Giants Stadium; East Rutherford, NJ	L 7–45	64,790	
September 10	at Colgate	Andy Kerr Stadium; Hamilton, NY	L 0–23	12,500	
September 17	Bucknell	Rutgers Stadium; Piscataway, NJ	W 36–14	14,500	
September 24	at Princeton	Palmer Stadium; Princeton, NJ (rivalry)	W 10–6	19,500	
October 1	at Cornell	Schoellkopf Field; Ithaca, NY	W 30–14	3,500	
October 8	at Connecticut	Memorial Stadium; Storrs, CT	W 42–18	6,589	
October 15	Lehigh^{†}	Rutgers Stadium; Piscataway, NJ	W 20–0	21,000	
October 29	at William & Mary	Cary Field; Williambsburg, VA	W 22–21	14,800	
November 5	at Temple	Veterans Stadium; Philadelphia, PA	L 14–24	10,091	
November 12	Tulane	Rutgers Stadium; Piscataway, NJ	W 47–8	16,000	
November 19	at Boston University	Nickerson Field; Boston, MA	W 63–8	14,400	
^{†}Homecoming

== Roster ==
1977 Rutgers Scarlet Knights football team roster
Players
Coaches
Offense

Pos.	#	Name	Class
QB	11	Bert Kosup	Sr

Defense

Pos.	#	Name	Class
S		Deron Cherry	Fr
DT	64	Dan Gray	So
DT	74	Dino Mangiero	So

Special teams

Pos.	#	Name	Class

Head coach

- Frank R. Burns

Coordinators/assistant coaches

Legend

- (C) Team captain
- (S) Suspended
- (I) Ineligible
- Injured
- Redshirt
