= 1977 South Carolina Gamecocks football team =

American college football season

1977 South Carolina Gamecocks football
- Conference: Independent
- Record: 5–7
- Head coach: Jim Carlen (3rd season)
- Defensive coordinator: Richard Bell (3rd season)
- Home stadium: Williams–Brice Stadium

1977 NCAA Division I independents football records
	Conf.					Overall
Team	W		L		T	W		L		T
No. 1 Notre Dame		–		–		11	–	1	–	0
No. 5 Penn State		–		–		11	–	1	–	0
Colgate		–		–		10	–	1	–	0
North Texas State *		–		–		10	–	1	–	0
No. 16 San Diego State		–		–		10	–	1	–	0
Tennessee State		–		–		8	–	1	–	1
No. 14 Florida State		–		–		10	–	2	–	0
No. 8 Pittsburgh		–		–		9	–	2	–	1
East Carolina		–		–		8	–	3	–	0
Rutgers		–		–		8	–	3	–	0
Army		–		–		7	–	4	–	0
Louisville		–		–		7	–	4	–	1
Boston College		–		–		6	–	5	–	0
Cincinnati		–		–		5	–	4	–	2
Georgia Tech		–		–		6	–	5	–	0
Memphis State		–		–		6	–	5	–	0
Northwestern State		–		–		6	–	5	–	0
Syracuse		–		–		6	–	5	–	0
William & Mary		–		–		6	–	5	–	0
Southern Miss		–		–		6	–	5	–	0
Temple		–		–		5	–	5	–	1
Hawaii		–		–		5	–	6	–	0
Navy		–		–		5	–	6	–	0
West Virginia		–		–		5	–	6	–	0
South Carolina		–		–		5	–	7	–	0
Utah State		–		–		4	–	7	–	0
Villanova		–		–		4	–	7	–	0
Illinois State		–		–		3	–	7	–	1
Virginia Tech		–		–		3	–	7	–	1
Miami (FL)		–		–		3	–	8	–	0
Richmond		–		–		3	–	8	–	0
Tulane		–		–		3	–	8	–	0
Air Force		–		–		2	–	8	–	1
Holy Cross		–		–		2	–	8	–	0
Northeast Louisiana		–		–		2	–	9	–	0
North Texas State (originally 9–2) awarded a forfeit win after Mississippi State was found to be using an ineligible player.; Rankings from AP Poll

The 1977 South Carolina Gamecocks football team represented the University of South Carolina as an independent during the 1977 NCAA Division I football season. Led by third-year head coach Jim Carlen, the Gamecocks compiled a record of 5–7. The team played its home games at Williams–Brice Stadium.

South Carolina almost made a 24-point comeback against archrival No. 15 Clemson at home, but ultimately lost after Tigers wide receiver Jerry Butler made "The Catch" to retake the lead with twenty seconds left in the game. ESPN would later rank this as the 112th greatest college football game of all time, the only time South Carolina appeared on the list. The Gamecocks finished with their first losing season since 1974.

== Schedule ==
Date	Opponent	Site	TV	Result	Attendance	Source
September 3	Appalachian State	Williams–Brice Stadium; Columbia, SC		W 32–17	50,114	
September 10	Georgia Tech	Williams–Brice Stadium; Columbia, SC		W 17–0	55,934	
September 17	Miami (OH)	Williams–Brice Stadium; Columbia, SC		W 42–19	46,234	
September 24	Georgia	Williams–Brice Stadium; Columbia, SC (rivalry)		L 13–15	56,784	
October 1	East Carolina	Williams–Brice Stadium; Columbia, SC	ABC	W 19–16	52,813	
October 8	Duke	Williams–Brice Stadium; Columbia, SC		L 21–25	49,385	
October 15	at Ole Miss	Hemingway Stadium; Oxford, MS		L 10–17	30,100	
October 22	at North Carolina	Kenan Memorial Stadium; Chapel Hill, NC (rivalry)		L 0–17	48,250	
October 29	at NC State	Carter Stadium; Raleigh, NC		L 3–7	40,800	
November 12	at Wake Forest	Groves Stadium; Winston-Salem, NC		W 24–14	13,150	
November 19	No. 15 Clemson	Williams–Brice Stadium; Columbia, SC (rivalry)	ABC	L 27–31	56,410	
November 26	at Hawaii	Aloha Stadium; Halawa, HI		L 7–24	30,146	
Rankings from AP Poll released prior to the game

== Roster ==
1977 South Carolina Gamecocks football team roster
Players
Coaches
Offense

Pos.	#	Name	Class
QB	10	Ronnie Bass	Sr
WR	41	Zion McKinney	So
RB	38	George Rogers	Fr

Defense

Pos.	#	Name	Class
DB	22	Mark Dantonio	Jr
DB	25	Rick Sanford	Jr

Special teams

Pos.	#	Name	Class
P	14	Max Runager	Jr

Head coach

- Jim Carlen

Coordinators/assistant coaches

Legend

- (C) Team captain
- (S) Suspended
- (I) Ineligible
- Injured
- Redshirt
