= 1977 Florida State Seminoles football team =

American college football season

1977 Florida State Seminoles football

Tangerine Bowl champion

Tangerine Bowl, W 40–17 vs. Texas Tech
- Conference: Independent

Ranking
- Coaches: No. 11
- AP: No. 14
- Record: 10–2
- Head coach: Bobby Bowden (2nd season)
- Offensive coordinator: George Haffner (2nd season)
- Offensive scheme: Multiple
- Defensive coordinator: Jack Stanton (2nd season)
- Base defense: 4–3
- Captains: Aaron Carter; Bill Duley; Larry Key; Tom Rushing; Nat Terry
- Home stadium: Doak Campbell Stadium

1977 NCAA Division I independents football records
| | Conf. | | | | | Overall |
| Team | W | | L | | T | W | | L | | T |
|---|---|---|---|---|---|---|---|---|---|---|
| No. 1 Notre Dame | | – | | – | | 11 | – | 1 | – | 0 |
| No. 5 Penn State | | – | | – | | 11 | – | 1 | – | 0 |
| Colgate | | – | | – | | 10 | – | 1 | – | 0 |
| North Texas State * | | – | | – | | 10 | – | 1 | – | 0 |
| No. 16 San Diego State | | – | | – | | 10 | – | 1 | – | 0 |
| Tennessee State | | – | | – | | 8 | – | 1 | – | 1 |
| No. 14 Florida State | | – | | – | | 10 | – | 2 | – | 0 |
| No. 8 Pittsburgh | | – | | – | | 9 | – | 2 | – | 1 |
| East Carolina | | – | | – | | 8 | – | 3 | – | 0 |
| Rutgers | | – | | – | | 8 | – | 3 | – | 0 |
| Army | | – | | – | | 7 | – | 4 | – | 0 |
| Louisville | | – | | – | | 7 | – | 4 | – | 1 |
| Boston College | | – | | – | | 6 | – | 5 | – | 0 |
| Cincinnati | | – | | – | | 5 | – | 4 | – | 2 |
| Georgia Tech | | – | | – | | 6 | – | 5 | – | 0 |
| Memphis State | | – | | – | | 6 | – | 5 | – | 0 |
| Northwestern State | | – | | – | | 6 | – | 5 | – | 0 |
| Syracuse | | – | | – | | 6 | – | 5 | – | 0 |
| William & Mary | | – | | – | | 6 | – | 5 | – | 0 |
| Southern Miss | | – | | – | | 6 | – | 5 | – | 0 |
| Temple | | – | | – | | 5 | – | 5 | – | 1 |
| Hawaii | | – | | – | | 5 | – | 6 | – | 0 |
| Navy | | – | | – | | 5 | – | 6 | – | 0 |
| West Virginia | | – | | – | | 5 | – | 6 | – | 0 |
| South Carolina | | – | | – | | 5 | – | 7 | – | 0 |
| Utah State | | – | | – | | 4 | – | 7 | – | 0 |
| Villanova | | – | | – | | 4 | – | 7 | – | 0 |
| Illinois State | | – | | – | | 3 | – | 7 | – | 1 |
| Virginia Tech | | – | | – | | 3 | – | 7 | – | 1 |
| Miami (FL) | | – | | – | | 3 | – | 8 | – | 0 |
| Richmond | | – | | – | | 3 | – | 8 | – | 0 |
| Tulane | | – | | – | | 3 | – | 8 | – | 0 |
| Air Force | | – | | – | | 2 | – | 8 | – | 1 |
| Holy Cross | | – | | – | | 2 | – | 8 | – | 0 |
| Northeast Louisiana | | – | | – | | 2 | – | 9 | – | 0 |
North Texas State (originally 9–2) awarded a forfeit win after Mississippi State was found to be using an ineligible player.; Rankings from AP Poll

The 1977 Florida State Seminoles football team represented Florida State University as an independent during the 1977 NCAA Division I football season. Led by second-year head coach Bobby Bowden, the Seminoles compiled a record of 10–2. Florida State was invited to the Tangerine Bowl, where the Seminoles defeated Texas Tech. The team played home games at Doak Campbell Stadium in Tallahassee, Florida.

== Schedule ==
| Date | Opponent | Rank | Site | TV | Result | Attendance | Source |
|---|---|---|---|---|---|---|---|
| September 10 | at Southern Miss | | M. M. Roberts Stadium; Hattiesburg, MS | | W 35–6 | 19,376 | |
| September 17 | at Kansas State | | KSU Stadium; Manhattan, KS | | W 18–10 | 26,200 | |
| September 24 | Miami (FL) | | Doak Campbell Stadium; Tallahassee, FL (rivalry) | | L 17–23 | 40,060 | |
| October 1 | at No. 17 Oklahoma State | | Lewis Field; Stillwater, OK | | W 25–17 | 46,500 | |
| October 8 | Cincinnati | | Doak Campbell Stadium; Tallahassee, FL | | W 14–0 | 33,755 | |
| October 22 | Auburn | | Doak Campbell Stadium; Tallahassee, FL | | W 24–3 | 42,464 | |
| October 29 | North Texas State^{†} | No. 20 | Doak Campbell Stadium; Tallahassee, FL | | W 35–14 | 40,597 | |
| November 5 | at Virginia Tech | No. 15 | Lane Stadium; Blacksburg, VA | | W 23–21 | 36,500 | |
| November 12 | Memphis State | No. 16 | Doak Campbell Stadium; Tallahassee, FL | | W 30–9 | 40,127 | |
| November 19 | at San Diego State | No. 13 | San Diego Stadium; San Diego, CA | | L 16–41 | 50,453 | |
| December 3 | at Florida | No. 19 | Florida Field; Gainesville, FL (rivalry) | ABC | W 37–9 | 63,563 | |
| December 23 | vs. Texas Tech | No. 19 | Orlando Stadium; Orlando, FL (Tangerine Bowl) | Mizlou | W 40–17 | 44,502 | |
^{†}Homecoming; Rankings from AP Poll released prior to the game

== Roster ==
1977 Florida State Seminoles football team roster
Players
Coaches
Offense

| Pos. | # | Name | Class |
|---|---|---|---|
| WR | 22 | Mike Barnes | Sr |
| OL | 63 | Tom Coll | So |
| G | 53 | Ronnie Crawford | So |
| OT | 72 | Doug Dane | Sr |
| WR | 23 | Jackie Flowers | So |
| G | 61 | Wade Johnson | Sr |
| QB | 15 | Jimmy Jordan | So |
| RB | 44 | Larry Key | Sr |
| OT | 72 | Ken Lanier | Fr |
| TE | 84 | Greg Lazzaro | Sr |
| C | 58 | John Madden | Fr |
| OT | 77 | Mark Meseroll | Sr |
| OT | 71 | Tom Rushing | Sr |
| RB | 36 | Chip Sanders | Jr |
| QB | 11 | Rick Stockstill | Fr |
| WR | 19 | Kurt Unglaub | So |

Defense

| Pos. | # | Name | Class |
|---|---|---|---|
| CB | 21 | Bobby Butler | Fr |
| DT | 76 | Walter Carter | So |
| DB | 46 | Ivory Joe Hunter | Jr |
| CB | 40 | Bobby Jackson | Sr |
| DL | 88 | Willie Jones | Jr |
| DB | 24 | Mike Kincaid | Sr |
| LB | 53 | Paul Piurowski | Fr |
| DL | 90 | Ed Richardson | So |
| DL | 54 | Arthur Scott | So |
| DL | 50 | Ron Simmons | Fr |
| DB | 47 | Nat Terry | Sr |
| DL | 80 | Scott Warren | So |

Special teams

| Pos. | # | Name | Class |
|---|---|---|---|
| P | 3 | Bill Duley | Sr |
| PK, P | 16 | Steve Dykes | Sr |
| PK | 14 | Ryals Lee | Jr |

Head coach

- Bobby Bowden

Coordinators/assistant coaches

Legend

- (C) Team captain
- (S) Suspended
- (I) Ineligible
- Injured
- Redshirt

== Game summaries ==
=== At Southern Miss ===
Florida State settled down in the 2nd half and rolled to a 35–6 victory over a stunned Southern Mississippi. The Seminoles were scoreless until a minute remained in the first half, when Ron Simmons blocked a punt and Scott Warren picked up the ball and ran it 2 yards for a touchdown that put the Noles on top to stay at 7–3. Florida State stretched it out to 14–6 in the third period, then exploded for three fourth quarter touchdowns. Jimmy Jordan threw two touchdown passes, one to Greg Lazzaro (34 yards) and one to Kurt Unglaub (8 yards). Mark Lyles scored from 1 yards out and Greg Ramsey caught a 12-yard TD pass from Wally Woodham.

=== At Kansas State ===
Larry Key ran for 120 yards and became the first Florida State football player ever to go over the 2,000 mark in career yardage. It was defense that did it as the Seminoles struggled to an 18–10 victory over Kansas State. The defense held K-State to just seven first downs and 173 total yards. Jimmy Jordan passed nine yards to a wide open Mike Shumann for a touchdown. The Seminoles went for two points, Jordan again hitting Shumann, making it 8–7. In the early going of the last quarter K-State regained the lead, 10–8 on a 19-yard field goal by Kris Thompson. With 6:58 to go in the game the Seminoles capped an 80-yard drive with Dave Cappelen's 27 yard field goal, moving back up 11–10. Then, with 2:27 left, Jordan hit Shumann at the goal line for a 26-yard touchdown.

=== Miami (FL) ===
Down 17–10, Miami ripped off 13 points in the final nine minutes and ended the Seminoles' five-game winning streak 23–17. Behind 10-0 after the 1st quarter, the Seminoles rallied to go ahead 11–10, then 17–10. Kenneth McMillian threw a 3-yard TD pass to Karl Monroe. Chris Dennis tied it 17–17 with 8:46 left. The next series saw a Jordan pass intercepted and Dennis kick the first of two 47 yard field goals for a 20-17 Miami lead as the clock showed 5:02. Then, with 4:11 remaining, Florida State gambled with a fourth-down pass at its 40. The pass missed. Miami took over, and got another Dennis field goal, for 23–17 with 2:09 left. Miami's fifth interception of the game spoiled FSU's last possession of the football.

=== At Oklahoma State ===
With Larry Key and Wally Woodham leading the way, Florida State patched-up its tattered offense and stuck it to Oklahoma State 25–17. Down 17–3 in the early minutes of the last half, the surprising Seminoles erupted for 22 point in a hurry. Key ran a school-record 32 times, including 14 times in the closing quarter. Key gained 127 yards running, 72 more on three pass receptions, and 60 on his single kickoff return. Woodham took over for starter Jimmy Jordan at quarterback late in the first half, the Seminoles trailing 10–0. With Woodham in, Florida State got points on the board four out of the five times it had the football. He completed nine of his 16 passes for 145 yards. Dave Cappelen kicked 36 and 30 yard field goals, the last one put FSU ahead to stay 18–17 with 6:36 left. Mark Lyles ran 2 yards for a touchdown and Wally Woodham ran 2 yards for a touchdown and threw a 18-yard TD pass to Larry Key.

=== Cincinnati ===
The Seminoles put down a rather pedestrian Cincinnati team 14–0. Wally Woodham threw for 265 yards and two touchdown passes, one to Mike Shuman (15 yards) and one to Roger Overby (36 yards) to lead the Seminoles to victory. The Seminole defense forced six turnovers, 4 interceptions and 2 fumble recoveries.

=== Auburn ===
Auburn traveled to Tallahassee to play #18 ranked Florida State at Doak Campbell Stadium. The Seminoles led 10–3 at halftime as the Tigers had trouble holding on to the ball. Larry Key led the charge in the 2nd half as the Noles held on for a 24–3 victory. Key had 170 yards rushing and ran for two touchdowns.

With Ron Simmons and Willie Jones putting the spurs to a spectacular clutch defense, Florida State rolled over North Texas State 35–14. Florida State had driven 78 yards to a 7–0 lead on the game's opening series, Wally Woodham scoring from the one. North Texas tied it 7–7 in the second quarter as Mike Jones scored from the one, capping an 85-yard drive. The Seminoles scored two touchdowns within a span of 44 playing seconds without a single offensive play from scrimmage. With 3:08 left in the first half, Bobby Butler blocked a punt that Ivory Joe Hunter picked up and took 19 yards for a touchdown. That made it 14–7. Ken Smith came in at quarterback for the Mean Green and on the first play, an attempted draw, saw a bobbled handoff at the goal line, and Willie Jones claimed the ball in the end zone for an FSU touchdown that brought it to 21–7 at halftime. Simmons sacked the quarterback five times during the game for a total yardage loss of 51.

=== At Virginia Tech ===
A 29-yard field goal by Dave Cappelen finally beat Virginia Tech 23–21 on a wet, grey homecoming afternoon before 36,500 folks at Lane Stadium in Blacksburg. Just moments before, Tech had driven 77 yards, all on the ground, for a 21–20 lead. A 39-yard pass by Mike Shumann off a reverse set up the winning 3 pointer, with Roger Overby on the receiving end. Cappelen had three field goals for the afternoon, the other two coming from 42 and 26 yards out. Trailing 14–3, Wally Woodham threw a 10-yard TD pass to Mike Shuman. Woodham sneaked in from the one yard line to give the Noles a 17–14 lead. Cappelen kicked two field goals, the game winner coming with 4:57 remaining in the game.

=== Memphis State ===
With a stinging defense that threw Memphis State backs for losses at least 15 times, Florida State ground out a 30–9 victory. Nose Guard Fred Igaz sacked Memphis quarterbacks three times. Just before halftime the Noles struck for a 10–0 lead. Dave Cappelen capped an 83-yard drive with a 30-yard field goal. Moments later, Willie Jones tackled a Memphis back and Jimmy Heggins hopped on the fumble at the Tiger 30. Woodham passed 27 yards to Mike Shumann for the touchdown. In the early moments of the fourth quarter, Bowden inserted Jimmy Jordan at quarterback. Jordan promptly directed a 50-yard drive for a touchdown. Mark Lyles scored from the four for a 20–3 lead. With Jordan still in there, the Seminoles got points on their next two series, Cappelen booting a 21-yard field goal and Greg Lazzaro grabbing a 13-yard TD pass, extending it to 30–3.

=== At San Diego State ===
Unable to cope with the brilliant dropback passing of Joe Davis, error-ridden Florida State fell to San Diego State 41–16. In the first half, a mishandled punt, a fumble, a blocked punt and an interception gave San Diego the football at FSU's 13, 12, 17 and 48. That led to 24 Aztec points. Florida State got a 22-yard field goal from Dave Cappelen late in the first quarter to cut the score to 14–3. Early in the second period Wally Woodham threw a 42-yard TD pass to Mike Shumann to narrow it to 21–10. But later Woodham fumbled at his 12 when blind-sided, and the Aztecs moved to a quick TD to make it 28–10. Trailing 41–10, Jimmy Jordan threw a 19-yard TD pass to Roger Overby for the final points of the game.

=== At Florida ===
Florida State at Florida

| Team | 1 | 2 | 3 | 4 | Total |
|---|---|---|---|---|---|
| • No. 19 Seminoles | 10 | 7 | 7 | 13 | 37 |
| Gators | 0 | 9 | 0 | 0 | 9 |

- Date: December 3
- Location: Florida Field, Gainesville, Florida
- Game attendance: 63,563
- Television network: ABC

Scoring summary
| 1 | 11:40 | FSU | Unglaub 38-yard pass from Woodham (Cappelen kick) | FSU 7-0 |
| 1 | 4:35 | FSU | Cappelen 47-yard field goal | FSU 10-0 |
| 2 | 13:39 | FLA | Yepremian 32-yard field goal | FSU 10-3 |
| 2 | 6:12 | FSU | Overby 4-yard pass from Jimmy Jordan (Cappelen kick) | FSU 17-3 |
| 2 | 2:32 | FLA | Yepremian 50-yard field goal | FSU 17-6 |
| 2 | 0:00 | FLA | Yepremian 41-yard field goal | FSU 17-9 |
| 3 | 10:04 | FSU | Overby 30-yard pass from Jordan (Cappelen kick) | FSU 24-9 |
| 4 | 12:30 | FSU | Mark Lyles 1-yard run (Cappelen kick) | FSU 31-9 |
| 4 | 11:25 | FSU | Roger Overby 20-yard pass from Jordan (kick failed) | FSU 37-9 |

Florida hosted the Seminoles at Florida Field and Bobby Bowden and his Seminoles broke a 9-game losing streak to Florida with a 37-9 thumping of the Gators. The Seminoles rolled up 578 yards of total offense while holding the Gators to 200 yards of total offense. Berj Yepremian kicked three field goals for all of the Gators points. The Noles quarterbacks, Wally Woodham and Jim Jordan operated the FSU offense with smooth efficiency all game as they combined to pass for 344 yards. The pair was affectionately known as the Seminoles two-headed quarterback, Wally Jim Jordham.

=== Texas Tech—Tangerine Bowl ===
Texas Tech vs. Florida State

| Team | 1 | 2 | 3 | 4 | Total |
|---|---|---|---|---|---|
| Red Raiders | 0 | 3 | 6 | 8 | 17 |
| • No. 19 Seminoles | 3 | 13 | 11 | 13 | 40 |

- Date: December 23
- Location: Orlando Stadium, Orlando, Florida
- Game attendance: 44,502
- Television network: Mizlou

Scoring summary
| 1 | 5:50 | FSU | Dave Cappelen 23-yard field goal | FSU 3-0 |
| 2 | 10:24 | TTU | Mike Mock 24-yard field goal | Tied 3-3 |
| 2 | 9:37 | FSU | Larry Key 93-yard kickoff return (Cappelen kick) | FSU 10-3 |
| 2 | 3:55 | FSU | Roger Overby 37-yard touchdown pass from Jimmy Jordan (kick failed) | FSU 16-3 |
| 3 | 12:30 | FSU | Mike Shumann 40-yard touchdown pass from Jordan (King pass from Jordan) | FSU 24-3 |
| 3 | 9:13 | FSU | Cappelen 22-yard field goal | FSU 27-3 |
| 3 | 7:46 | TTU | Nelson 44-yard touchdown pass from Rodney Allison (Allison pass failed) | FSU 27-9 |
| 4 | 3:39 | FSU | Roger Overby 15-yard touchdown pass from Jimmy Jordan (Cappelen kick) | FSU 34-9 |
| 4 | 2:01 | TTU | Billy Taylor 21-yard touchdown run (Taylor pass from Allison) | FSU 34-17 |
| 4 | 0:48 | FSU | Chip Sanders 44-yard touchdown pass from Wally Woodham (Cappelen kick) | FSU 40-17 |

Jimmy Jordan threw 18-of-25 for 311 yards and three touchdowns on the way to an MVP effort. Florida State had 22 first downs to Texas Tech's 21 first downs. Tech had 99 rushing yards (on 44 carries) while the Seminoles had 85 (on 37 carries). Florida State threw for 455 passing yards while the Red Raiders threw for 379. The Seminoles had two turnovers, but the Red Raiders turned it over four times. While Florida State had 10 penalties for 130 yards, they managed to convert their opportunities into points, whereas Tech did not do as such, at least until the second half where it was too late. Roger Overby caught two touchdown passes and Larry Key returned a kickoff 93 yards for a touchdown for the Seminoles.
