= 1977 Tangerine Bowl =

American college football game

Texas Tech Red Raiders	Florida State Seminoles
(7–4)	(9–2)
SWC	Independent
17	40
Head coach: Steve Sloan	Head coach: Bobby Bowden
	AP / Coaches; 19 / NR
	1	2	3	4	Total
Texas Tech	0	3	6	8	17
Florida State	3	13	11	13	40
- Date: December 23, 1977
- Season: 1977
- Stadium: Orlando Stadium
- Location: Orlando, Florida
- MVP: Jimmy Jordan, Florida State (offensive & overall); Willie Jones, Florida State (defensive)
- Attendance: 44,502
- Payout: US$190,000 per school

United States TV coverage
- Network: Mizlou
- Announcers: Duane Dow, Don Perkins and Howard David

The 1977 Tangerine Bowl was an American college football bowl game played on December 23, 1977, at Orlando Stadium in Orlando, Florida. The game pitted the Florida State Seminoles and the Texas Tech Red Raiders.

== Background ==
Texas Tech started the season ranked #8 in the nation, winning their first two games of the season before a face-off with #6 Texas A&M, which they lost 33–17. Three straight wins got them to #14, but a 26–0 loss to #1 Texas dropped them out permanently. Wins over TCU and SMU followed, but they lost to Houston and #6 Arkansas to finish the season. They finished tied for fourth in the Southwest Conference. This was their sixth bowl game of the decade. Florida State had just two losses, compounded with a six-game winning streak. They reached #13 at one point (before a loss to San Diego State), but they finished the season strong with a 37–9 thrashing of Florida. This was their first bowl game since 1971.

== Game summary ==
- Florida State – Dave Cappelen 23-yard field goal, 5:50 remaining
- Texas Tech – Mike Mock 24-yard field goal, 10:24 remaining
- Florida State – Larry Key 93 yard kickoff return touchdown (Cappelen kick), 9:37 remaining
- Florida State – Roger Overby 37-yard touchdown pass from Jimmy Jordan (Cappelen kick failed), 3:55 remaining
- Florida State – Mike Shumann 40-yard touchdown pass from Jordan (King pass from Jordan), 12:30 remaining
- Florida State – Cappelen 22-yard field goal, 9:13 remaining
- Texas Tech – Nelson 44-yard touchdown pass from Rodney Allison (Allison pass failed), 7:46 remaining
- Florida State – Overby 15-yard touchdown pass from Jordan (Cappelen kick), 3:39 remaining
- Texas Tech – Billy Taylor 21-yard touchdown run (Taylor pass from Allison), 2:01 remaining
- Florida State – Chip Sanders 44-yard touchdown pass from Wally Woodham (Cappelen kick), :48 remaining

Jimmy Jordan threw 18-of-25 for 311 yards and three touchdowns en route to an MVP effort. Florida State had 22 first downs to Texas Tech's 21 first downs. Tech had 99 rushing yards (on 44 carries) while the Seminoles had 85 (on 37 carries). Florida State threw for 455 passing yards while the Red Raiders threw for 379. The Seminoles had two turnovers, but the Red Raiders turned it over four times. While Florida State had 10 penalties for 130 yards, they managed to convert their opportunities into points, where as Tech did not do as such, at least until the second half where it was too late.

== Statistics ==
Statistics	Texas Tech	Florida State
First downs	21	22
Rushing yards	99	85
Passing yards	279	455
Total offense	378	540
Passing	18–28–2	35–35–0
Punts–average	7–29.6	3–35.6
Return yards	11	5
Fumbles–lost	3–3	2–2
Penalties–yards	3–50	10–130

== Aftermath ==
The Red Raiders did not qualify for another bowl game until the 1986 Independence Bowl. Florida State's next bowl appearance was the 1980 Orange Bowl.
