= 1977 Boston University Terriers football team =

American college football season

1977 Boston University Terriers football
- Conference: Yankee Conference
- Record: 3–7 (1–4 Yankee)
- Head coach: Rick Taylor (1st season)
- Home stadium: Nickerson Field

1977 Yankee Conference football standings
	Conf.					Overall
Team	W		L		T	W		L		T
No. 2 UMass $	5	–	0	–	0	8	–	3	–	0
Rhode Island	4	–	1	–	0	6	–	5	–	0
New Hampshire	3	–	2	–	0	8	–	2	–	0
Boston University	1	–	4	–	0	3	–	7	–	0
Maine	1	–	4	–	0	3	–	7	–	0
Connecticut	1	–	4	–	0	1	–	10	–	0
$ – Conference champion; Rankings from Associated Press poll

The 1977 Boston University Terriers football team was an American football team that represented Boston University as a member of the Yankee Conference during the 1977 NCAA Division II football season. In their first season under head coach Rick Taylor, the Terriers compiled a 3–7 record (1–4 against conference opponents), finished in a three-way tie for last place in the conference, and were outscored by a total of 313 to 177.

== Schedule ==
Date	Opponent	Site	Result	Attendance	Source
September 17	New Hampshire	Nickerson Field; Boston, MA	L 14–26	4,320	
September 24	at Northeastern*	Parsons Field; Brookline, MA	W 37–15	4,856	
October 1	Dartmouth	Nickerson Field; Boston, MA	L 0–38	7,320	
October 8	at No. 8 UMass	Alumni Stadium; Hadley, MA	L 16–41	4,700	
October 15	at Holy Cross*	Fitton Field; Worcester, MA	W 14–13	6,110	
October 22	Rhode Island	Nickerson Field; Boston, MA	L 22–31	3,120	
October 29	Colgate	Nickerson Field; Boston, MA	L 22–43	6,100–6,180	
November 5	Connecticut	Nickerson Field; Boston, MA	L 21–23	3,664	
November 12	at Maine	Alumni Field; Orono, ME	W 23–20	4,100	
November 19	Rutgers*	Nickerson Field; Boston, MA	L 8–63	14,400	
*Non-conference game; Rankings from AP Poll released prior to the game
