= 1977 Temple Owls football team =

American college football season

1977 Temple Owls football

Mirage Bowl, L 32–35 vs. Grambling State
- Conference: Independent
- Record: 5–5–1
- Head coach: Wayne Hardin (8th season)
- Home stadium: Veterans Stadium, Franklin Field

1977 NCAA Division I independents football records
	Conf.					Overall
Team	W		L		T	W		L		T
No. 1 Notre Dame		–		–		11	–	1	–	0
No. 5 Penn State		–		–		11	–	1	–	0
Colgate		–		–		10	–	1	–	0
North Texas State *		–		–		10	–	1	–	0
No. 16 San Diego State		–		–		10	–	1	–	0
Tennessee State		–		–		8	–	1	–	1
No. 14 Florida State		–		–		10	–	2	–	0
No. 8 Pittsburgh		–		–		9	–	2	–	1
East Carolina		–		–		8	–	3	–	0
Rutgers		–		–		8	–	3	–	0
Army		–		–		7	–	4	–	0
Louisville		–		–		7	–	4	–	1
Boston College		–		–		6	–	5	–	0
Cincinnati		–		–		5	–	4	–	2
Georgia Tech		–		–		6	–	5	–	0
Memphis State		–		–		6	–	5	–	0
Northwestern State		–		–		6	–	5	–	0
Syracuse		–		–		6	–	5	–	0
William & Mary		–		–		6	–	5	–	0
Southern Miss		–		–		6	–	5	–	0
Temple		–		–		5	–	5	–	1
Hawaii		–		–		5	–	6	–	0
Navy		–		–		5	–	6	–	0
West Virginia		–		–		5	–	6	–	0
South Carolina		–		–		5	–	7	–	0
Utah State		–		–		4	–	7	–	0
Villanova		–		–		4	–	7	–	0
Illinois State		–		–		3	–	7	–	1
Virginia Tech		–		–		3	–	7	–	1
Miami (FL)		–		–		3	–	8	–	0
Richmond		–		–		3	–	8	–	0
Tulane		–		–		3	–	8	–	0
Air Force		–		–		2	–	8	–	1
Holy Cross		–		–		2	–	8	–	0
Northeast Louisiana		–		–		2	–	9	–	0
North Texas State (originally 9–2) awarded a forfeit win after Mississippi State was found to be using an ineligible player.; Rankings from AP Poll

The 1977 Temple Owls football team was an American football team that represented Temple University as an independent during the 1977 NCAA Division I football season. In its eighth season under head coach Wayne Hardin, the team compiled a 5–5–1 record and was outscored by a total of 286 to 229. The team played its home games at Veterans Stadium (four games) and Franklin Field (one game) in Philadelphia.

The team's statistical leaders included Pat Carey with 1,074 passing yards, Anthony Anderson with 756 rushing yards and 66 points scored, and Steve Watson with 573 receiving yards. On September 17, Temple set a new school record with 477 rushing yards in a 42–0 victory over Drake.

== Schedule ==
Date	Opponent	Site	Result	Attendance	Source
September 10	Southern Illinois	Franklin Field; Philadelphia, PA	L 20–24	9,087	
September 17	Drake	Veterans Stadium; Philadelphia, PA	W 42–0	8,395	
September 24	Pittsburgh	Veterans Stadium; Philadelphia, PA	L 0–76	13,199	
October 1	at Delaware	Delaware Stadium; Newark, DE	W 6–3	19,677	
October 8	at West Virginia	Mountaineer Field; Morgantown, WV	L 16–38	32,822	
October 22	Southwestern Louisiana	Veterans Stadium; Philadelphia, PA	W 27–20	4,320	
October 29	at Cincinnati	Nippert Stadium; Cincinnati, OH	T 17–17	14,534	
November 5	Rutgers	Veterans Stadium; Philadelphia, PA	W 24–14	10,091	
November 12	at No. 9 Penn State	Beaver Stadium; University Park, PA	L 7–44	61,327	
November 19	at Villanova	Villanova Stadium; Villanova, PA (Mayor's Cup)	W 38–15	10,000	
December 11	vs. Grambling State	Korakuen Stadium; Tokyo, Japan (Mirage Bowl)	L 32–35	50,000	
Rankings from AP Poll released prior to the game

== Roster ==
1977 Temple Owls football team roster
Players
Coaches
Offense

Pos.	#	Name	Class
RB	25	Anthony Anderson	Jr
QB	7	Bob Baker	Sr
QB	12	Brian Broomell	So
RB	28	Zachary Dixon	Jr
WR	84	Steve Watson	Jr

Defense

Pos.	#	Name	Class
LB	54	Mike Curcio	So

Special teams

Pos.	#	Name	Class
K	1	Frank Mike-Meyer	Sr

Head coach

- Wayne Hardin

Coordinators/assistant coaches

Legend

- (C) Team captain
- (S) Suspended
- (I) Ineligible
- Injured
- Redshirt
