= 1977 Miami Hurricanes football team =

American college football season

1977 Miami Hurricanes football
- Conference: Independent
- Record: 3–8
- Head coach: Lou Saban (1st season)
- Offensive scheme: T formation
- Defensive coordinator: Rick Lantz (1st season)
- Base defense: 4–3
- MVP: Don Smith
- Home stadium: Miami Orange Bowl

1977 NCAA Division I independents football records
	Conf.					Overall
Team	W		L		T	W		L		T
No. 1 Notre Dame		–		–		11	–	1	–	0
No. 5 Penn State		–		–		11	–	1	–	0
Colgate		–		–		10	–	1	–	0
North Texas State *		–		–		10	–	1	–	0
No. 16 San Diego State		–		–		10	–	1	–	0
Tennessee State		–		–		8	–	1	–	1
No. 14 Florida State		–		–		10	–	2	–	0
No. 8 Pittsburgh		–		–		9	–	2	–	1
East Carolina		–		–		8	–	3	–	0
Rutgers		–		–		8	–	3	–	0
Army		–		–		7	–	4	–	0
Louisville		–		–		7	–	4	–	1
Boston College		–		–		6	–	5	–	0
Cincinnati		–		–		5	–	4	–	2
Georgia Tech		–		–		6	–	5	–	0
Memphis State		–		–		6	–	5	–	0
Northwestern State		–		–		6	–	5	–	0
Syracuse		–		–		6	–	5	–	0
William & Mary		–		–		6	–	5	–	0
Southern Miss		–		–		6	–	5	–	0
Temple		–		–		5	–	5	–	1
Hawaii		–		–		5	–	6	–	0
Navy		–		–		5	–	6	–	0
West Virginia		–		–		5	–	6	–	0
South Carolina		–		–		5	–	7	–	0
Utah State		–		–		4	–	7	–	0
Villanova		–		–		4	–	7	–	0
Illinois State		–		–		3	–	7	–	1
Virginia Tech		–		–		3	–	7	–	1
Miami (FL)		–		–		3	–	8	–	0
Richmond		–		–		3	–	8	–	0
Tulane		–		–		3	–	8	–	0
Air Force		–		–		2	–	8	–	1
Holy Cross		–		–		2	–	8	–	0
Northeast Louisiana		–		–		2	–	9	–	0
North Texas State (originally 9–2) awarded a forfeit win after Mississippi State was found to be using an ineligible player.; Rankings from AP Poll

The 1977 Miami Hurricanes football team represented the University of Miami as an independent during the 1977 NCAA Division I football season. Led by first-year head coach Lou Saban, the Hurricanes played their home games at the Miami Orange Bowl in Miami, Florida. Miami finished the season with a record of 3–8.

== Schedule ==
Date	Time	Opponent	Site	TV	Result	Attendance	Source
September 10	1:30 pm	at No. 5 Ohio State	Ohio Stadium; Columbus, OH		L 0–10	86,287	
September 17		at Georgia Tech	Grant Field; Atlanta, GA		L 6–10	31,916	
September 24		at Florida State	Doak Campbell Stadium; Tallahassee, FL (rivalry)		W 23–17	40,060	
October 1		Pacific (CA)	Miami Orange Bowl; Miami, FL		W 24–3	33,608	
October 8		Kansas	Miami Orange Bowl; Miami, FL		W 14–7	28,010	
October 22		at TCU	Amon G. Carter Stadium; Fort Worth, TX		L 17–21	12,224	
October 29		at No. 9 Penn State	Beaver Stadium; University Park, PA		L 7–49	61,853	
November 5		Tulane	Miami Orange Bowl; Miami, FL		L 10–13	20,140	
November 12		at No. 2 Alabama	Bryant–Denny Stadium; Tuscaloosa, AL		L 0–36	57,422	
November 26		Florida	Miami Orange Bowl; Miami, FL (rivalry)		L 14–31	30,662	
December 3	8:00 pm	at No. 5 Notre Dame	Miami Orange Bowl; Miami, FL (rivalry)	CBS	L 10–48	35,789	
Rankings from AP Poll released prior to the game

== Roster ==
1977 Miami Hurricanes football team roster
Players
Coaches
Offense

Pos.	#	Name	Class
TE		Steve Alvers
RB	47	Ottis Anderson	Jr
QB		E.J. Baker
FB		Woody Bennett
OT		Charles Bloxsom
OT		Larry Brown
TE		Charlie Claud
RB		Chris Hobbs
WR		Jim Joiner	Fr
QB		Kenny McMillian
TE		Karl Monroe
OT		Bob O'Gara
C		Tom Sedley
G		Jim Standifer
RB		Taylor Timmons
WR		Pat Walker	Fr
C		Mike White

Defense

Pos.	#	Name	Class
LB		Mozell Axsom	Fr
DB		Joe Bettencourt
DT		Jim Browning
DB		Gene Coleman
LB		Craig Cosden
DT		John Evans
DB		Bryan Ferguson
DT		Tony Galente
LB		Barry Gonzalez
LB		George Halas
LB		Glenn Hill
LB		Herb Jackson
MG		Don Kreuger
MG	79	Don Latimer	Sr
LB		John McGriff
LB		Earl Monroe
LB		Kevin Roberts
DB		Malcolm Simmons
DT	75	Don Smith	Jr
LB		Ed Stanley
DB		John Swain	Fr
DB	26	John Turner	Sr
DB		Rick Valerio

Special teams

Pos.	#	Name	Class
K		Chris Dennis
P		Bob Rajsich

Head coach

- Lou Saban

Coordinators/assistant coaches

- Len Fontes – Defensive backs
- Ron Marciniak – Offensive line

Legend

- (C) Team captain
- (S) Suspended
- (I) Ineligible
- Injured
- Redshirt

== Game summaries ==
=== Georgia Tech ===
Team	1	2	3	4	Total
Miami (FL)	0	0	0	6	6
• Georgia Tech	0	0	10	0	10

- Date: September 17
- Location: Grant Field
- Game attendance: 31,916

Scoring summary
Q3	11:06	GT	Lanier 14 yard run (Dassel kick)	GT 7–0
Q3	7:30	GT	Dassel 20 yard field goal	GT 10–0
Q4	0:40	MIA	Anderson 4 yard pass from Baker (pass failed)	GT 10–6
