= 1977 Connecticut Huskies football team =

American college football season

1977 Connecticut Huskies football
- Conference: Yankee Conference
- Record: 1–10 (1–4 Yankee)
- Head coach: Walt Nadzak (1st season)
- Home stadium: Memorial Stadium

1977 Yankee Conference football standings
| | Conf. | | | | | Overall |
| Team | W | | L | | T | W | | L | | T |
|---|---|---|---|---|---|---|---|---|---|---|
| No. 2 UMass $ | 5 | – | 0 | – | 0 | 8 | – | 3 | – | 0 |
| Rhode Island | 4 | – | 1 | – | 0 | 6 | – | 5 | – | 0 |
| New Hampshire | 3 | – | 2 | – | 0 | 8 | – | 2 | – | 0 |
| Boston University | 1 | – | 4 | – | 0 | 3 | – | 7 | – | 0 |
| Maine | 1 | – | 4 | – | 0 | 3 | – | 7 | – | 0 |
| Connecticut | 1 | – | 4 | – | 0 | 1 | – | 10 | – | 0 |
$ – Conference champion; Rankings from Associated Press poll

The 1977 Connecticut Huskies football team represented the University of Connecticut in the 1977 NCAA Division II football season. The Huskies were led by first-year head coach Walt Nadzak, and completed the season with a record of 1–10.

== Schedule ==
| Date | Opponent | Site | Result | Attendance | Source |
|---|---|---|---|---|---|
| September 10 | Lehigh* | Taylor Stadium; Bethlehem, PA | L 0–49 | 9,500 | |
| September 17 | at Navy* | Navy–Marine Corps Memorial Stadium; Annapolis, MD | L 7–38 | 15,659 | |
| September 24 | at Yale* | Yale Bowl; New Haven, CT | L 12–23 | 11,334 | |
| October 1 | No. 3 New Hampshire | Memorial Stadium; Storrs, CT | L 7–42 | 7,578 | |
| October 8 | Rutgers* | Memorial Stadium; Storrs, CT | L 18–42 | 6,589 | |
| October 15 | at Maine | Alumni Field; Orono, ME | L 7–9 | 3,200 | |
| October 22 | No. 6 UMass | Memorial Stadium; Storrs, CT (rivalry) | L 0–10 | 7,122 | |
| October 29 | at Delaware* | Delaware Stadium; Newark, DE | L 0–28 | 20,206 | |
| November 5 | at Boston University | Nickerson Field; Boston, MA | W 23–21 | 3,664 | |
| November 12 | at Rhode Island | Meade Stadium; Kingston, RI (rivalry) | L 7–14 | 5,312 | |
| November 19 | Holy Cross* | Memorial Stadium; Storrs, CT | L 3–14 | 5,246 | |
*Non-conference game; Rankings from AP Poll released prior to the game
