= 1977 Memphis State Tigers football team =

American college football season

1977 Memphis State Tigers football
- Conference: Independent
- Record: 6–5
- Head coach: Richard Williamson (3rd season)
- Offensive coordinator: Jim Ragland (3rd season)
- Captain: Keith Butler
- Home stadium: Liberty Bowl Memorial Stadium

1977 NCAA Division I independents football records
| | Conf. | | | | | Overall |
| Team | W | | L | | T | W | | L | | T |
|---|---|---|---|---|---|---|---|---|---|---|
| No. 1 Notre Dame | | – | | – | | 11 | – | 1 | – | 0 |
| No. 5 Penn State | | – | | – | | 11 | – | 1 | – | 0 |
| Colgate | | – | | – | | 10 | – | 1 | – | 0 |
| North Texas State * | | – | | – | | 10 | – | 1 | – | 0 |
| No. 16 San Diego State | | – | | – | | 10 | – | 1 | – | 0 |
| Tennessee State | | – | | – | | 8 | – | 1 | – | 1 |
| No. 14 Florida State | | – | | – | | 10 | – | 2 | – | 0 |
| No. 8 Pittsburgh | | – | | – | | 9 | – | 2 | – | 1 |
| East Carolina | | – | | – | | 8 | – | 3 | – | 0 |
| Rutgers | | – | | – | | 8 | – | 3 | – | 0 |
| Army | | – | | – | | 7 | – | 4 | – | 0 |
| Louisville | | – | | – | | 7 | – | 4 | – | 1 |
| Boston College | | – | | – | | 6 | – | 5 | – | 0 |
| Cincinnati | | – | | – | | 5 | – | 4 | – | 2 |
| Georgia Tech | | – | | – | | 6 | – | 5 | – | 0 |
| Memphis State | | – | | – | | 6 | – | 5 | – | 0 |
| Northwestern State | | – | | – | | 6 | – | 5 | – | 0 |
| Syracuse | | – | | – | | 6 | – | 5 | – | 0 |
| William & Mary | | – | | – | | 6 | – | 5 | – | 0 |
| Southern Miss | | – | | – | | 6 | – | 5 | – | 0 |
| Temple | | – | | – | | 5 | – | 5 | – | 1 |
| Hawaii | | – | | – | | 5 | – | 6 | – | 0 |
| Navy | | – | | – | | 5 | – | 6 | – | 0 |
| West Virginia | | – | | – | | 5 | – | 6 | – | 0 |
| South Carolina | | – | | – | | 5 | – | 7 | – | 0 |
| Utah State | | – | | – | | 4 | – | 7 | – | 0 |
| Villanova | | – | | – | | 4 | – | 7 | – | 0 |
| Illinois State | | – | | – | | 3 | – | 7 | – | 1 |
| Virginia Tech | | – | | – | | 3 | – | 7 | – | 1 |
| Miami (FL) | | – | | – | | 3 | – | 8 | – | 0 |
| Richmond | | – | | – | | 3 | – | 8 | – | 0 |
| Tulane | | – | | – | | 3 | – | 8 | – | 0 |
| Air Force | | – | | – | | 2 | – | 8 | – | 1 |
| Holy Cross | | – | | – | | 2 | – | 8 | – | 0 |
| Northeast Louisiana | | – | | – | | 2 | – | 9 | – | 0 |
North Texas State (originally 9–2) awarded a forfeit win after Mississippi State was found to be using an ineligible player.; Rankings from AP Poll

The 1977 Memphis State Tigers football team represented Memphis State University (now known as the University of Memphis) as an independent during the 1977 NCAA Division I football season. In its third season under head coach Richard Williamson, the team compiled a 6–5 record and outscored opponents by a total of 228 to 194. The team played its home games at Liberty Bowl Memorial Stadium in Memphis, Tennessee.

The team's statistical leaders included Lloyd Patterson with 1,336 passing yards, James King with 626 rushing yards, Earnest Gray with 826 receiving yards, and Rusty Bennett with 60 points scored (21 extra points, 13 field goals).

== Schedule ==
| Date | Opponent | Site | Result | Attendance | Source |
|---|---|---|---|---|---|
| September 3 | at Ole Miss | Mississippi Veterans Memorial Stadium; Jackson, MS (rivalry) | L 3–7 | 45,500 | |
| September 10 | Tulane | Liberty Bowl Memorial Stadium; Memphis, TN | W 27–9 | | |
| September 17 | Utah State | Liberty Bowl Memorial Stadium; Memphis, TN | W 31–26 | 21,364 | |
| September 24 | Virginia Tech | Liberty Bowl Memorial Stadium; Memphis, TN | W 21–20 | 20,463 | |
| October 1 | Louisville^{†} | Liberty Bowl Memorial Stadium; Memphis, TN (rivalry) | L 13–14 | 22,750 | |
| October 15 | Mississippi State | Liberty Bowl Memorial Stadium; Memphis, TN | W 21–13 | 48,432 | |
| October 22 | North Texas State | Liberty Bowl Memorial Stadium; Memphis, TN | L 19–20 | 30,065 | |
| October 29 | Southern Miss | Liberty Bowl Memorial Stadium; Memphis, TN (Black and Blue Bowl) | W 42–14 | 28,420 | |
| November 5 | at Tennessee | Neyland Stadium; Knoxville, TN | L 14–27 | 82,573 | |
| November 12 | at No. 16 Florida State | Doak Campbell Stadium; Tallahassee, FL | L 9–30 | 40,167 | |
| November 19 | at Wichita State | Cessna Stadium; Wichita, KS | W 28–14 | 25,819 | |
^{†}Homecoming; Rankings from AP Poll released prior to the game
