= 1977 Virginia Tech Gobblers football team =

American college football season

1977 Virginia Tech Gobblers football
- Conference: Independent
- Record: 3–7–1
- Head coach: Jimmy Sharpe (4th season)
- Home stadium: Lane Stadium

1977 NCAA Division I independents football records
	Conf.					Overall
Team	W		L		T	W		L		T
No. 1 Notre Dame		–		–		11	–	1	–	0
No. 5 Penn State		–		–		11	–	1	–	0
Colgate		–		–		10	–	1	–	0
North Texas State *		–		–		10	–	1	–	0
No. 16 San Diego State		–		–		10	–	1	–	0
Tennessee State		–		–		8	–	1	–	1
No. 14 Florida State		–		–		10	–	2	–	0
No. 8 Pittsburgh		–		–		9	–	2	–	1
East Carolina		–		–		8	–	3	–	0
Rutgers		–		–		8	–	3	–	0
Army		–		–		7	–	4	–	0
Louisville		–		–		7	–	4	–	1
Boston College		–		–		6	–	5	–	0
Cincinnati		–		–		5	–	4	–	2
Georgia Tech		–		–		6	–	5	–	0
Memphis State		–		–		6	–	5	–	0
Northwestern State		–		–		6	–	5	–	0
Syracuse		–		–		6	–	5	–	0
William & Mary		–		–		6	–	5	–	0
Southern Miss		–		–		6	–	5	–	0
Temple		–		–		5	–	5	–	1
Hawaii		–		–		5	–	6	–	0
Navy		–		–		5	–	6	–	0
West Virginia		–		–		5	–	6	–	0
South Carolina		–		–		5	–	7	–	0
Utah State		–		–		4	–	7	–	0
Villanova		–		–		4	–	7	–	0
Illinois State		–		–		3	–	7	–	1
Virginia Tech		–		–		3	–	7	–	1
Miami (FL)		–		–		3	–	8	–	0
Richmond		–		–		3	–	8	–	0
Tulane		–		–		3	–	8	–	0
Air Force		–		–		2	–	8	–	1
Holy Cross		–		–		2	–	8	–	0
Northeast Louisiana		–		–		2	–	9	–	0
North Texas State (originally 9–2) awarded a forfeit win after Mississippi State was found to be using an ineligible player.; Rankings from AP Poll

The 1977 Virginia Tech Gobblers football team was an American football team that represented Virginia Tech as an independent during the 1977 NCAA Division I football season. In their fourth year under head coach Jimmy Sharpe, the Gobblers compiled an overall record of 3–7–1.

== Schedule ==
Date	Opponent	Site	Result	Attendance	Source
September 17	No. 7 Texas A&M	Lane Stadium; Blacksburg, VA	L 6–37	33,500	
September 24	at Memphis State	Liberty Bowl Memorial Stadium; Memphis, TN	L 20–21	20,463	
October 1	Clemson	Lane Stadium; Blacksburg, VA	L 13–31	34,000	
October 8	vs. William & Mary	City Stadium; Richmond, VA (Tobacco Bowl)	W 17–8	18,698	
October 15	Virginia	Lane Stadium; Blacksburg, VA (rivalry)	T 14–14	40,000	
October 22	at Richmond	City Stadium; Richmond, VA	L 14–17	19,500	
October 29	at No. 7 Kentucky	Commonwealth Stadium; Lexington, KY	L 0–32	57,914	
November 5	No. 15 Florida State^{†}	Lane Stadium; Blacksburg, VA	L 21–23	36,500	
November 12	at West Virginia	Mountineer Field; Morgantown, WV (rivalry)	L 14–20	29,041	
November 19	Wake Forest	Lane Stadium; Blacksburg, VA	W 28–10	20,000	
November 26	VMI	Lane Stadium; Blacksburg, VA (rivalry)	W 27–7	10,000	
^{†}Homecoming; Rankings from AP Poll released prior to the game

== Roster ==
The following players were members of the 1977 football team.

1977 Virginia Tech Hokies football team roster
Players
Coaches
Offense

Pos.	#	Name	Class
WR	41	Dale Babione	Sr
OT	69	Greg Birtsch	Jr
RB	2	Roscoe Coles	Sr
FB	47	Glen Comer	Sr
WR		John Drinkard
RB		Larry Fallen	Jr
TE	88	Mickey Fitzgerald	So

Defense

Pos.	#	Name	Class
DL		Chris Albrittain	Fr
LB		Jeff Bailey	Fr
DB		Gippy Belcher	Jr
DB	15	Henry Bradley	Sr
DB	45	Gene Bunn	Jr
LB		Chris Cosh	Fr
DE		David DeHart	Sr

Special teams

Pos.	#	Name	Class
K		Paul Engle	Jr

Head coach

- Jimmy Sharpe

Coordinators/assistant coaches

Legend

- (C) Team captain
- (S) Suspended
- (I) Ineligible
- Injured
- Redshirt
