= 1977 Tulane Green Wave football team =

American college football season

1977 Tulane Green Wave football
- Conference: Independent
- Record: 3–8
- Head coach: Larry Smith (2nd season)
- Defensive coordinator: Moe Ankney (2nd season)
- Home stadium: Louisiana Superdome

1977 NCAA Division I independents football records
	Conf.					Overall
Team	W		L		T	W		L		T
No. 1 Notre Dame		–		–		11	–	1	–	0
No. 5 Penn State		–		–		11	–	1	–	0
Colgate		–		–		10	–	1	–	0
North Texas State *		–		–		10	–	1	–	0
No. 16 San Diego State		–		–		10	–	1	–	0
Tennessee State		–		–		8	–	1	–	1
No. 14 Florida State		–		–		10	–	2	–	0
No. 8 Pittsburgh		–		–		9	–	2	–	1
East Carolina		–		–		8	–	3	–	0
Rutgers		–		–		8	–	3	–	0
Army		–		–		7	–	4	–	0
Louisville		–		–		7	–	4	–	1
Boston College		–		–		6	–	5	–	0
Cincinnati		–		–		5	–	4	–	2
Georgia Tech		–		–		6	–	5	–	0
Memphis State		–		–		6	–	5	–	0
Northwestern State		–		–		6	–	5	–	0
Syracuse		–		–		6	–	5	–	0
William & Mary		–		–		6	–	5	–	0
Southern Miss		–		–		6	–	5	–	0
Temple		–		–		5	–	5	–	1
Hawaii		–		–		5	–	6	–	0
Navy		–		–		5	–	6	–	0
West Virginia		–		–		5	–	6	–	0
South Carolina		–		–		5	–	7	–	0
Utah State		–		–		4	–	7	–	0
Villanova		–		–		4	–	7	–	0
Illinois State		–		–		3	–	7	–	1
Virginia Tech		–		–		3	–	7	–	1
Miami (FL)		–		–		3	–	8	–	0
Richmond		–		–		3	–	8	–	0
Tulane		–		–		3	–	8	–	0
Air Force		–		–		2	–	8	–	1
Holy Cross		–		–		2	–	8	–	0
Northeast Louisiana		–		–		2	–	9	–	0
North Texas State (originally 9–2) awarded a forfeit win after Mississippi State was found to be using an ineligible player.; Rankings from AP Poll

The 1977 Tulane Green Wave football team was an American football team that represented Tulane University during the 1977 NCAA Division I football season as an independent. In their second year under head coach Larry Smith, the team compiled a 3–8 record.

== Schedule ==
Date	Opponent	Site	Result	Attendance	Source
September 10	at Memphis State	Liberty Bowl Memorial Stadium; Memphis, TN	L 9–27		
September 17	Stanford	Louisiana Superdome; New Orleans, LA	L 17–21	30,482	
September 24	at SMU	Cotton Bowl; Dallas, TX	L 23–28	18,460	
October 1	Vanderbilt	Louisiana Superdome; New Orleans, LA	W 36–7	21,483	
October 8	at Boston College	Alumni Stadium; Chestnut Hill, MA	L 28–30	18,577	
October 15	Cincinnati	Louisiana Superdome; New Orleans, LA	W 16–13		
October 22	Georgia Tech	Louisiana Superdome; New Orleans, LA	L 14–38	28,345	
October 29	at No. 13 Pittsburgh	Pitt Stadium; Pittsburgh, PA	L 0–48	46,273	
November 5	at Miami (FL)	Miami Orange Bowl; Miami, FL	W 13–10	20,140	
November 12	at Rutgers	Rutgers Stadium; New Brunswick, NJ	L 8–47	16,000	
November 19	LSU	Louisiana Superdome; New Orleans, LA (Battle for the Rag)	L 17–20	72,205	
Rankings from AP Poll released prior to the game

== Roster ==
1977 Tulane Green Wave football team roster
Players
Coaches
Offense

Pos.	#	Name	Class
WR	3	Alton Alexis	So
QB	12	Nickie Hall	Fr
OT	76	Eric Laakso	Sr
RB	2	Reggie Scott	Jr

Defense

Pos.	#	Name	Class
DE	98	Darryl Dawkins	Fr
DE	97	Marty Wetzel	Fr
DB	4	Mike Sims	So
DB	6	Ricky Smith	Jr
DB	5	Phillip Townsend	So

Special teams

Pos.	#	Name	Class
K	9	Eddie Murray	So

Head coach

- Larry Smith

Coordinators/assistant coaches

Legend

- (C) Team captain
- (S) Suspended
- (I) Ineligible
- Injured
- Redshirt
