= 1977 Air Force Falcons football team =

American college football season

1977 Air Force Falcons football
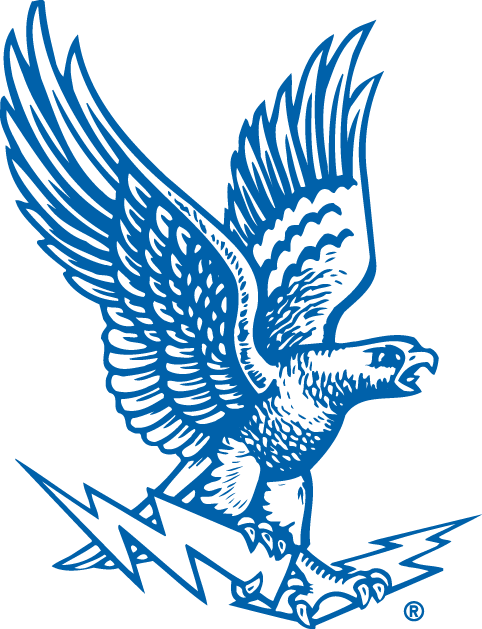
- Conference: Independent
- Record: 2–8–1
- Head coach: Ben Martin (20th season)
- Captains: Jack Kucera; Jim Weidmann
- Home stadium: Falcon Stadium

1977 NCAA Division I independents football records
	Conf.					Overall
Team	W		L		T	W		L		T
No. 1 Notre Dame		–		–		11	–	1	–	0
No. 5 Penn State		–		–		11	–	1	–	0
Colgate		–		–		10	–	1	–	0
North Texas State *		–		–		10	–	1	–	0
No. 16 San Diego State		–		–		10	–	1	–	0
Tennessee State		–		–		8	–	1	–	1
No. 14 Florida State		–		–		10	–	2	–	0
No. 8 Pittsburgh		–		–		9	–	2	–	1
East Carolina		–		–		8	–	3	–	0
Rutgers		–		–		8	–	3	–	0
Army		–		–		7	–	4	–	0
Louisville		–		–		7	–	4	–	1
Boston College		–		–		6	–	5	–	0
Cincinnati		–		–		5	–	4	–	2
Georgia Tech		–		–		6	–	5	–	0
Memphis State		–		–		6	–	5	–	0
Northwestern State		–		–		6	–	5	–	0
Syracuse		–		–		6	–	5	–	0
William & Mary		–		–		6	–	5	–	0
Southern Miss		–		–		6	–	5	–	0
Temple		–		–		5	–	5	–	1
Hawaii		–		–		5	–	6	–	0
Navy		–		–		5	–	6	–	0
West Virginia		–		–		5	–	6	–	0
South Carolina		–		–		5	–	7	–	0
Utah State		–		–		4	–	7	–	0
Villanova		–		–		4	–	7	–	0
Illinois State		–		–		3	–	7	–	1
Virginia Tech		–		–		3	–	7	–	1
Miami (FL)		–		–		3	–	8	–	0
Richmond		–		–		3	–	8	–	0
Tulane		–		–		3	–	8	–	0
Air Force		–		–		2	–	8	–	1
Holy Cross		–		–		2	–	8	–	0
Northeast Louisiana		–		–		2	–	9	–	0
North Texas State (originally 9–2) awarded a forfeit win after Mississippi State was found to be using an ineligible player.; Rankings from AP Poll

The 1977 Air Force Falcons football team represented the United States Air Force Academy as an independent during the 1977 NCAA Division I football season. Led by Ben Martin in his 20th and final year as head coach, the Falcons compiled a record of 2–8–1 and were outscored by their opponents 296–114. Air Force played their home games at Falcon Stadium in Colorado Springs, Colorado.

== Schedule ==
Date	Time	Opponent	Site	Result	Attendance	Source
September 10		at Wyoming	War Memorial Stadium; Laramie, WY	T 0–0	27,107	
September 17		at California	California Memorial Stadium; Berkeley, CA	L 14–24	35,165	
September 24		Pacific (CA)	Falcon Stadium; Colorado Springs, CO	W 15–13	24,783	
October 1		at Georgia Tech	Grant Field; Atlanta, GA	L 3–30	30,067	
October 8		at Navy	Navy–Marine Corps Memorial Stadium; Annapolis, MD (Commander-in-Chief's Trophy)	L 7–10	30,030	
October 15		Arizona State	Falcon Stadium; Colorado Springs, CO	L 14–37	25,477	
October 22		at Baylor	Baylor Stadium; Waco, TX	L 7–38	30,350	
October 29		Boston College	Falcon Stadium; Colorado Springs, CO	L 14–36	21,663	
November 5		Army	Falcon Stadium; Colorado Springs, CO (Commander-in-Chief's Trophy)	L 6–31	34,338	
November 12		Vanderbilt	Falcon Stadium; Colorado Springs, CO	W 34–28	18,570	
November 19	11:30 a.m.	at No. 6 Notre Dame	Notre Dame Stadium; Notre Dame, IN (rivalry)	L 0–49	59,075	
Rankings from AP Poll released prior to the game; All times are in Mountain time

== Roster ==
1977 Air Force Falcons football team roster
Players
Coaches
Offense

Pos.	#	Name	Class
		Paul Williams
QB		Dave Ziebart

Defense

Pos.	#	Name	Class

Special teams

Pos.	#	Name	Class
K		Terry Harris

Head coach

- Ben Martin (20th year)

Coordinators/assistant coaches

- Jerry Davitch (WR)

Legend

- (C) Team captain
- (S) Suspended
- (I) Ineligible
- Injured
- Redshirt

After the season in January, wide receiver coach Jerry Davitch was hired as head coach at the University of Idaho.
