= 1977 Rhode Island Rams football team =

American college football season

1977 Rhode Island Rams football
- Conference: Yankee Conference
- Record: 6–5 (4–1 Yankee)
- Head coach: Bob Griffin (2nd season)
- Defensive coordinator: Pete Adrian (2nd season)
- Home stadium: Meade Stadium

1977 Yankee Conference football standings
| | Conf. | | | | | Overall |
| Team | W | | L | | T | W | | L | | T |
|---|---|---|---|---|---|---|---|---|---|---|
| No. 2 UMass $ | 5 | – | 0 | – | 0 | 8 | – | 3 | – | 0 |
| Rhode Island | 4 | – | 1 | – | 0 | 6 | – | 5 | – | 0 |
| New Hampshire | 3 | – | 2 | – | 0 | 8 | – | 2 | – | 0 |
| Boston University | 1 | – | 4 | – | 0 | 3 | – | 7 | – | 0 |
| Maine | 1 | – | 4 | – | 0 | 3 | – | 7 | – | 0 |
| Connecticut | 1 | – | 4 | – | 0 | 1 | – | 10 | – | 0 |
$ – Conference champion; Rankings from Associated Press poll

The 1977 Rhode Island Rams football team was an American football team that represented the University of Rhode Island in the Yankee Conference during the 1977 NCAA Division II football season. In their second season under head coach Bob Griffin, the Rams compiled a 6–5 record (4–1 against conference opponents) and finished in second place in the conference.

== Schedule ==
| Date | Opponent | Site | Result | Attendance | Source |
|---|---|---|---|---|---|
| September 10 | at Northeastern* | Brookline, MA | L 12–21 | 4,812 | |
| September 17 | Holy Cross* | Meade Stadium; Kingston, RI | W 14–0 | 5,742 | |
| September 24 | at Brown* | Brown Stadium; Providence, RI | L 10–28 | 7,400 | |
| October 1 | Maine^{†} | Meade Stadium; Kingston, RI | W 28–0 | 7,300–8,457 | |
| October 8 | Lehigh* | Meade Stadium; Kingston, RI | L 16–42 | 4,115 | |
| October 15 | at No. 7 UMass | Alumni Stadium; Hadley, MA | L 6–37 | 10,500 | |
| October 22 | at Boston University | Nickerson Field; Boston, MA | W 31–22 | 3,120 | |
| October 29 | No. 1 New Hampshire | Meade Stadium; Kingston, RI | W 21–20 | 8,813 | |
| November 5 | at Merchant Marine* | Kings Point, NY | W 27–3 | 2,900 | |
| November 12 | Connecticut | Meade Stadium; Kingston, RI | W 14–7 | 5,312 | |
| November 19 | at VMI* | Alumni Memorial Field; Lexington, VA | L 7–20 | 5,200 | |
*Non-conference game; ^{†}Homecoming; Rankings from Associated Press Poll released prior to the game
