= 1977 Utah State Aggies football team =

American college football season

1977 Utah State Aggies football
- Conference: Independent
- Record: 4–7
- Head coach: Bruce Snyder (2nd season)
- Home stadium: Romney Stadium

1977 NCAA Division I independents football records
	Conf.					Overall
Team	W		L		T	W		L		T
No. 1 Notre Dame		–		–		11	–	1	–	0
No. 5 Penn State		–		–		11	–	1	–	0
Colgate		–		–		10	–	1	–	0
North Texas State *		–		–		10	–	1	–	0
No. 16 San Diego State		–		–		10	–	1	–	0
Tennessee State		–		–		8	–	1	–	1
No. 14 Florida State		–		–		10	–	2	–	0
No. 8 Pittsburgh		–		–		9	–	2	–	1
East Carolina		–		–		8	–	3	–	0
Rutgers		–		–		8	–	3	–	0
Army		–		–		7	–	4	–	0
Louisville		–		–		7	–	4	–	1
Boston College		–		–		6	–	5	–	0
Cincinnati		–		–		5	–	4	–	2
Georgia Tech		–		–		6	–	5	–	0
Memphis State		–		–		6	–	5	–	0
Northwestern State		–		–		6	–	5	–	0
Syracuse		–		–		6	–	5	–	0
William & Mary		–		–		6	–	5	–	0
Southern Miss		–		–		6	–	5	–	0
Temple		–		–		5	–	5	–	1
Hawaii		–		–		5	–	6	–	0
Navy		–		–		5	–	6	–	0
West Virginia		–		–		5	–	6	–	0
South Carolina		–		–		5	–	7	–	0
Utah State		–		–		4	–	7	–	0
Villanova		–		–		4	–	7	–	0
Illinois State		–		–		3	–	7	–	1
Virginia Tech		–		–		3	–	7	–	1
Miami (FL)		–		–		3	–	8	–	0
Richmond		–		–		3	–	8	–	0
Tulane		–		–		3	–	8	–	0
Air Force		–		–		2	–	8	–	1
Holy Cross		–		–		2	–	8	–	0
Northeast Louisiana		–		–		2	–	9	–	0
North Texas State (originally 9–2) awarded a forfeit win after Mississippi State was found to be using an ineligible player.; Rankings from AP Poll

The 1977 Utah State Aggies football team was an American football team that represented Utah State University as an independent during the 1977 NCAA Division I football season. In their second season under head coach Bruce Snyder, the Aggies compiled a 4–7 record and were outscored by opponents by a total of 249 to 117.

== Schedule ==
Date	Opponent	Site	Result	Attendance	Source
September 10	San Jose State	Romney Stadium; Logan, UT	W 22–10	13,870	
September 17	at Memphis State	Liberty Bowl Memorial Stadium; Memphis, TN	L 26–31	21,364	
September 24	BYU	Romney Stadium; Logan, UT (rivalry)	L 6–65	20,103	
October 1	at San Diego State	San Diego Stadium; San Diego, CA	L 0–19	43,161	
October 8	at Penn State	Beaver Stadium; University Park, PA	L 7–16	62,015	
October 15	at Utah	Robert Rice Stadium; Salt Lake City, UT (Battle of the Brothers)	L 0–20	25,438	
October 29	Boise State^{†}	Romney Stadium; Logan, UT	L 16–23	6,216	
November 5	at Weber State	Wildcat Stadium; Ogden, UT	W 23–14	8,163	
November 12	Wyoming	Romney Stadium; Logan, UT (rivalry)	W 32–31	13,280	
November 19	at Idaho State	ASISU Minidome; Pocatello, ID	W 35–7	6,250	
November 26	at Colorado State	Hughes Stadium; Fort Collins, CO	L 10–13	5,280	
^{†}Homecoming

== Roster ==
1977 Utah State Aggies football team roster
Players
Coaches
Offense

Pos.	#	Name	Class
WR	25	Ron Cassidy	Jr
G	71	Jim Hough	Sr
QB	10	Eric Hipple	So
RB	24	Rick Parros	So
TE	82	John Thompson	Jr

Defense

Pos.	#	Name	Class
DE	80	Rulon Jones	So
FS	46	Dave Parkin	Jr

Special teams

Pos.	#	Name	Class

Head coach

- Bruce Snyder

Coordinators/assistant coaches

Legend

- (C) Team captain
- (S) Suspended
- (I) Ineligible
- Injured
- Redshirt
