= 1977 Cincinnati Bearcats football team =

American college football season

1977 Cincinnati Bearcats football
- Conference: Independent
- Record: 5–4–2
- Head coach: Ralph Staub (1st season)
- Defensive coordinator: Mark Duffner (1st season)
- Captains: Gardner Cobb; Howie Kurnick; Napolean Outlaw; Dan Rains; Mike Woods
- Home stadium: Nippert Stadium

1977 NCAA Division I independents football records
	Conf.					Overall
Team	W		L		T	W		L		T
No. 1 Notre Dame		–		–		11	–	1	–	0
No. 5 Penn State		–		–		11	–	1	–	0
Colgate		–		–		10	–	1	–	0
North Texas State *		–		–		10	–	1	–	0
No. 16 San Diego State		–		–		10	–	1	–	0
Tennessee State		–		–		8	–	1	–	1
No. 14 Florida State		–		–		10	–	2	–	0
No. 8 Pittsburgh		–		–		9	–	2	–	1
East Carolina		–		–		8	–	3	–	0
Rutgers		–		–		8	–	3	–	0
Army		–		–		7	–	4	–	0
Louisville		–		–		7	–	4	–	1
Boston College		–		–		6	–	5	–	0
Cincinnati		–		–		5	–	4	–	2
Georgia Tech		–		–		6	–	5	–	0
Memphis State		–		–		6	–	5	–	0
Northwestern State		–		–		6	–	5	–	0
Syracuse		–		–		6	–	5	–	0
William & Mary		–		–		6	–	5	–	0
Southern Miss		–		–		6	–	5	–	0
Temple		–		–		5	–	5	–	1
Hawaii		–		–		5	–	6	–	0
Navy		–		–		5	–	6	–	0
West Virginia		–		–		5	–	6	–	0
South Carolina		–		–		5	–	7	–	0
Utah State		–		–		4	–	7	–	0
Villanova		–		–		4	–	7	–	0
Illinois State		–		–		3	–	7	–	1
Virginia Tech		–		–		3	–	7	–	1
Miami (FL)		–		–		3	–	8	–	0
Richmond		–		–		3	–	8	–	0
Tulane		–		–		3	–	8	–	0
Air Force		–		–		2	–	8	–	1
Holy Cross		–		–		2	–	8	–	0
Northeast Louisiana		–		–		2	–	9	–	0
North Texas State (originally 9–2) awarded a forfeit win after Mississippi State was found to be using an ineligible player.; Rankings from AP Poll

The 1977 Cincinnati Bearcats football team represented University of Cincinnati during 1977 NCAA Division I-A football season. The Bearcats, led by first-year head coach Ralph Staub, participated as independent and played their home games at Nippert Stadium.

== Schedule ==
Date	Opponent	Site	Result	Attendance	Source
September 10	Northwestern State	Nippert Stadium; Cincinnati, OH	W 41–0	8,926	
September 17	at Louisville	Fairgrounds Stadium; Louisville, KY (rivalry)	T 17–17	25,384	
September 24	Northeast Louisiana	Nippert Stadium; Cincinnati, OH	W 63–0	13,079	
October 1	Southern Miss	Nippert Stadium; Cincinnati, OH	W 17–6	13,392	
October 8	at Florida State	Doak Campbell Stadium; Tallahassee, FL	L 0–14	33,755	
October 15	at Tulane	Louisiana Superdome; New Orleans, LA	L 13–16		
October 22	Tulsa	Nippert Stadium; Cincinnati, OH	W 28–0	14,400	
October 29	Temple	Nippert Stadium; Cincinnati, OH	T 17–17	14,534	
November 5	at Ohio	Peden Stadium; Athens, OH	W 38–26		
November 19	at Vanderbilt	Dudley Field; Nashville, TN	L 9–13	16,500	
November 24	Miami (OH)	Nippert Stadium; Cincinnati, OH (Victory Bell)	L 7–12	13,550	

== Roster ==
1977 Cincinnati Bearcats football team roster
Players
Coaches
Offense

Pos.	#	Name	Class

Defense

Pos.	#	Name	Class
MG	54	Howie Kurnick
DE	84	Dan Rains	Sr
LB	30	Mike Woods	Sr

Special teams

Pos.	#	Name	Class
K	4	Mike Connell	Sr

Head coach

- Ralph Staub

Coordinators/assistant coaches

Legend

- (C) Team captain
- (S) Suspended
- (I) Ineligible
- Injured
- Redshirt
