= Jim Rourke =

American football player (born 1957)

No. 65, 70, 77
- Positions: Offensive tackle, guard

Personal information
- Born: February 10, 1957 (age 69); Weymouth, Massachusetts, U.S.
- Listed height: 6 ft 5 in (1.96 m)
- Listed weight: 264 lb (120 kg)

Career information
- College: Boston College
- NFL draft: 1979: 9th round, 238th overall pick

Career history
- Oakland Raiders (1979)*; Kansas City Chiefs (1980–1984); New Orleans Saints (1985); Kansas City Chiefs (1986–1987); Cincinnati Bengals (1988)
- * Offseason or practice squad member only

Career NFL statistics
- Games played: 77
- Games started: 25
- Stats at Pro Football Reference

James Peter Rourke (born February 10, 1957) is an American former professional football player who was an offensive lineman for seven seasons in the National Football League (NFL). He played college football for the Boston College Eagles. He played in the NFL for the Kansas City Chiefs (1980–1984, 1986), the New Orleans Saints (1985) and the Cincinnati Bengals (1988).
