= 1977 McNeese State Cowboys football team =

American college football season

1977 McNeese State Cowboys football
- Conference: Southland Conference
- Record: 5–5–1 (1–3–1 Southland)
- Head coach: Jack Doland (8th season)
- Home stadium: Cowboy Stadium

1977 Southland Conference football standings
	Conf.					Overall
Team	W		L		T	W		L		T
Louisiana Tech $	4	–	0	–	1	9	–	1	–	2
Southwestern Louisiana	2	–	1	–	2	6	–	4	–	2
UT Arlington	3	–	2	–	0	5	–	6	–	0
Arkansas State	2	–	3	–	0	7	–	4	–	0
McNeese State	1	–	3	–	1	5	–	5	–	1
Lamar	1	–	4	–	0	2	–	9	–	0
$ – Conference champion

The 1977 McNeese State Cowboys football team was an American football team that represented McNeese State University as a member of the Southland Conference (Southland) during the 1977 NCAA Division I football season. In their eighth year under head coach Jack Doland, the team compiled an overall record of 5–5–1 with a mark of 1–3–1 in conference play, and were fifth in the Southland.

== Schedule ==
Date	Opponent	Site	Result	Attendance	Source
September 10	Indiana State*	Cowboy Stadium; Lake Charles, LA	W 25–7	20,000	
September 17	West Texas State*	Cowboy Stadium; Lake Charles, LA	W 20–8		
September 24	at Eastern Michigan*	Rynearson Stadium; Ypsilanti, MI	L 7–9	7,250	
October 1	Louisiana Tech	Cowboy Stadium; Lake Charles, LA	L 7–14	23,571	
October 8	at UT Arlington	Cravens Field; Arlington, TX	L 7–24	6,500	
October 15	at Northeast Louisiana*	Brown Stadium; Monroe, LA	W 29–7		
October 22	Arkansas State	Cowboy Stadium; Lake Charles, LA	W 17–14		
October 29	Nicholls State*	Cowboy Stadium; Lake Charles, LA	L 7–24	17,725	
November 5	at Northwestern State*	Harry Turpin Stadium; Natchitoches, LA (rivalry)	W 14–7		
November 12	Lamar	Cowboy Stadium; Lake Charles, LA (rivalry)	L 7–35		
November 25	at Southwestern Louisiana	Cajun Field; Lafayette, LA (rivalry)	T 9–9		
*Non-conference game
