= Northwestern State Demons football, 1970–1979 =

American college football seasons

The Northwestern State Demons football program, 1970–1979 represented Northwestern State University during the 1970s in college football. During this time, the Demons were led by three head coaches and had an overall record of 48–54–1. During this decade, Northwestern State competed in a pair of conferences and as independent and played their home games at three separate stadiums.

Glenn Gossett served as head coach at Northwestern State for the 1970 and 1971 seasons and led the Demons to a record of 13–5–1. The 1970 season was the last Northwestern State competed as a member of the Gulf States Conference where they has been a member since 1948. Gossett resigned as head coach in May 1972 after the Demons competed as an independent for the season. From 1972 to 1974 Northwestern State competed as a member of the Gulf South Conference under the leadership of head coach George Doherty. During his tenure as head coach, Doherty led the Demons to an overall record of 15–17 and a conference championship in 1972. Northwestern State left the Gulf South Conference after the 1974 season and competed as an independent for the remainder of the decade under head coach A. L. Williams. Williams led the Demons to an overall record of 20–32 from 1975 to 1979 and through their transition from Division II to Division I.

From 1970 to 1974, Northwestern played their home games on-camous at Demon Stadium in Natchitoches, Louisiana. After the 1974 season, Demon Stadium was demolished and Harry Turpin Stadium was built at the same location in its place and opened for their 1976 season. While under construction, Northwestern State played their home games off-campus at State Fair Stadium in Shreveport, Louisiana for their 1975 season.

== 1970 ==
1970 Northwestern State Demons football
- Conference: Gulf States Conference
- Record: 7–3 (3–2 GSC)
- Head coach: Glenn Gossett (4th season)
- Home stadium: Demon Stadium

1970 Gulf States Conference football standings
	Conf.					Overall
Team	W		L		T	W		L		T
Southwestern Louisiana $	5	–	0	–	0	9	–	2	–	0
Northwestern State	3	–	2	–	0	7	–	3	–	0
Northeast Louisiana	3	–	2	–	0	5	–	4	–	0
McNeese State	2	–	3	–	0	5	–	6	–	0
Southeastern Louisiana	2	–	3	–	0	4	–	6	–	0
Louisiana Tech	0	–	5	–	0	2	–	8	–	0
$ – Conference champion

The 1970 Northwestern State Demons football team was an American football team that represented Northwestern State University as a member of the Gulf States Conference (GSC) during the 1970 NCAA College Division football season. In their fourth year under head coach Glenn Gossett, the team compiled an overall record of 7–3 with a mark of 3–2 in conference play, and finished tied for second in the GSC. Northwestern State played their home games on campus at Demon Stadium in Natchitoches, Louisiana.

Schedule

Date	Time	Opponent	Site	Result	Attendance	Source
September 12	7:30 p.m.	Florence State*	Demon Stadium; Natchitoches, LA	W 42–21		
September 19		at Stephen F. Austin*	Lumberjack Stadium; Nacogdoches, TX (rivalry)	W 9–7	13,000	
September 26		at Southwestern State (OK)*	Milam Stadium; Weatherford, OK	W 22–14		
October 3		at Northeast Louisiana	Brown Stadium; Monroe, LA	L 17–21	8,100	
October 17		Pensacola Navy*	Demon Stadium; Natchitoches, LA	W 21–6		
October 24		vs. Louisiana Tech	State Fair Stadium; Shreveport, LA (rivalry)	W 20–17	25,000	
October 31		at Jacksonville State*	Paul Snow Stadium; Jacksonville, AL	L 6–35		
November 7		at McNeese State	Cowboy Stadium; Lake Charles, LA (rivalry)	W 15–7	12,300	
November 14		No. 17 Southwestern Louisiana	Demon Stadium; Natchitoches, LA	L 21–24	7,800	
November 21		Southeastern Louisiana	Demon Stadium; Natchitoches, LA	W 22–14	5,500	
*Non-conference game; Rankings from AP Poll released prior to the game; All times are in Central time

== 1971 ==
1971 Northwestern State Demons football
- Conference: Independent
- Record: 6–2–1
- Head coach: Glenn Gossett (5th season)
- Home stadium: Demon Stadium

1971 NCAA College Division independents football records
	Conf.			Overall
Team	W	L	T	W		L		T
No. 1 Delaware		–		10	–	1	–	0
No. 5 Tennessee State		–		9	–	1	–	0
No. 2 McNeese State		–		9	–	1	–	1
Samford		–		8	–	1	–	0
Colorado College		–		7	–	1	–	0
No. 8 Akron		–		8	–	2	–	0
No. 3 Eastern Michigan		–		7	–	1	–	2
Arkansas AM&N		–		7	–	2	–	0
Indiana (PA)		–		7	–	2	–	0
Kentucky State		–		8	–	3	–	0
Appalachian State		–		7	–	3	–	1
Northern Michigan		–		7	–	3	–	0
Hawaii		–		7	–	4	–	0
Illinois College		–		5	–	3	–	0
Ashland		–		6	–	4	–	0
Santa Clara		–		6	–	4	–	0
Southern Illinois		–		6	–	4	–	0
Tampa		–		6	–	5	–	0
UNLV		–		5	–	4	–	1
Bucknell		–		5	–	5	–	0
Central Michigan		–		5	–	5	–	0
Milwaukee		–		5	–	5	–	0
Nevada		–		5	–	5	–	0
St. Norbert		–		5	–	5	–	0
Wayne State (MI)		–		4	–	4	–	0
Hofstra		–		5	–	6	–	0
Cortland		–		4	–	5	–	0
Northeastern		–		4	–	5	–	0
Portland State		–		4	–	5	–	0
Ball State		–		4	–	5	–	1
Chicago		–		3	–	4	–	0
Northeast Louisiana		–		4	–	6	–	1
Eastern Illinois		–		4	–	6	–	0
Indiana State		–		4	–	6	–	0
Saint Mary's		–		3	–	5	–	0
Rose-Hulman		–		3	–	6	–	0
Boston University		–		3	–	7	–	0
Drexel		–		2	–	6	–	0
Chattanooga		–		2	–	9	–	0
Rankings from AP small college poll

The 1971 Northwestern State Demons football team was an American football team that represented Northwestern State University as an independent during the 1971 NCAA College Division football season. In their fifth year under head coach Glenn Gossett, the team compiled a 6–2–1 record. Northwestern State played their home games on campus at Demon Stadium in Natchitoches, Louisiana.

Northwestern State competed as an independent for the 1971 season after the dissolution of the Gulf States Conference. This was also the final season for Gossett as head coach as he resigned from the position in May 1972.

Schedule

Date	Opponent	Site	Result	Attendance	Source
September 11	vs. Gustavus Adolphus	State Fair Stadium; Shreveport, LA	W 24–10	3,000	
September 18	at Stephen F. Austin	Lumberjack Stadium; Nacogdoches, TX (rivalry)	W 18–7	4,800	
September 25	Southwestern State (OK)	Demon Stadium; Natchitoches, LA	W 17–10	7,500	
October 2	Northeast Louisiana	Demon Stadium; Natchitoches, LA	L 14–15	5,000	
October 16	at Delta State	Delta Field; Cleveland, MS	W 9–7	6,000	
October 23	vs. No. 10 Louisiana Tech	State Fair Stadium; Shreveport, LA (rivalry)	L 21–33	27,000	
November 6	No. 1 McNeese State	Demon Stadium; Natchitoches, LA (rivalry)	T 3–3	7,000	
November 13	at Southwestern Louisiana	Cajun Field; Lafayette, LA	W 27–19	10,600	
November 20	at Southeastern Louisiana	Strawberry Field; Hammond, LA	W 14–6	5,000	
Rankings from AP Poll released prior to the game

== 1972 ==
1972 Northwestern State Demons football

GSC champion
- Conference: Gulf South Conference

Ranking
- AP: No. 15
- Record: 8–2 (6–0 GSC)
- Head coach: George Doherty (1st season)
- Home stadium: Demon Stadium

1972 Gulf South Conference football standings
	Conf.					Overall
Team	W		L		T	W		L		T
No. 15 Northwestern State $	6	–	0	–	0	8	–	2	–	0
No. 3 Livingston ^	5	–	1	–	0	8	–	1	–	2
No. 19 Jacksonville State	4	–	1	–	1	7	–	2	–	1
Delta State	5	–	2	–	0	7	–	3	–	1
Troy State	2	–	3	–	1	4	–	5	–	1
Southeastern Louisiana	2	–	4	–	0	4	–	7	–	0
Nicholls State	1	–	5	–	0	3	–	8	–	0
Florence State	1	–	5	–	0	2	–	9	–	0
Tennessee–Martin	1	–	5	–	0	1	–	9	–	0
Mississippi College *	0	–	0	–	0	4	–	5	–	1
$ – Conference champion; ^ – NAIA Division I playoff participant * – Did not compete for conference title; Rankings from NAIA Division I poll

The 1972 Northwestern State Demons football team was an American football team that represented Northwestern State University as a member of the Gulf South Conference (GSC) during the 1972 NCAA College Division football season. In their first year under head coach George Doherty, the team compiled an overall record of 8–2 with a mark of 6–0 in conference play, and finished as GSC champion. Northwestern State played their home games on campus at Demon Stadium in Natchitoches, Louisiana.

This season marked the first Northwestern State played as a member of the GSC after a single season played as an independent. Their games against Stephen F. Austin, Northeast Louisiana, and McNeese State were all designated as conference games and counted in the Gulf South standings.

Doherty was promoted from an assistant to head coach in May 1972 after the resignation of Glenn Gossett.

Schedule

Date	Opponent	Rank	Site	Result	Attendance	Source
September 9	at Southwestern State (OK)*		Milam Stadium; Weatherford, OK	L 3–7	4,000	
September 16	Stephen F. Austin		Demon Stadium; Natchitoches, LA (rivalry)	W 20–7	7,500	
September 23	Bishop*		Demon Stadium; Natchitoches, LA	W 32–12	8,000	
September 30	at Northeast Louisiana		Brown Stadium; Monroe, LA	W 17–7	8,300	
October 7	Delta State		Demon Stadium; Natchitoches, LA	W 12–0	8,000	
October 14	at Florence State		Braly Municipal Stadium; Florence, AL	W 14–7	6,000	
October 21	vs. No. 1 Louisiana Tech*		State Fair Stadium; Shreveport, LA (rivalry)	L 16–20	27,000	
November 4	at No. 7 McNeese State		Cowboy Stadium; Lake Charles, LA (rivalry)	W 25–10	14,000	
November 11	Southwestern Louisiana*	No. 18	Demon Stadium; Natchitoches, LA	W 24–8	7,100	
November 18	Southeastern Louisiana	No. 14	Demon Stadium; Natchitoches, LA	W 6–3	900	
*Non-conference game; Rankings from AP Poll released prior to the game

== 1973 ==
1973 Northwestern State Demons football
- Conference: Gulf South Conference
- Record: 6–5 (3–4 GSC)
- Head coach: George Doherty (2nd season)
- Home stadium: Demon Stadium

1973 Gulf South Conference football standings
	Conf.					Overall
Team	W		L		T	W		L		T
No. T–17 Troy State $	6	–	1	–	0	7	–	2	–	1
No. 4 Jacksonville State	5	–	2	–	0	7	–	2	–	0
Delta State	6	–	3	–	0	8	–	3	–	0
Livingston	4	–	3	–	1	6	–	3	–	1
Northwestern State	3	–	4	–	0	5	–	6	–	0
Mississippi College	3	–	4	–	0	4	–	6	–	0
Southeastern Louisiana	3	–	4	–	0	4	–	6	–	0
Florence State	3	–	6	–	0	4	–	6	–	0
Nicholls State	2	–	7	–	0	2	–	9	–	0
Tennessee–Martin	1	–	5	–	1	2	–	8	–	1
$ – Conference champion; Rankings from NAIA Division I poll

The 1973 Northwestern State Demons football team was an American football team that represented Northwestern State University as a member of the Gulf South Conference (GSC) during the 1973 NCAA Division II football season. In their second year under head coach George Doherty, the team compiled an overall record of 6–5 with a mark of 3–4 in conference play, and finished tied for fifth in the GSC. Northwestern State played their home games on campus at Demon Stadium in Natchitoches, Louisiana.

Their games against Southwestern State (OK), Northeast Louisiana, and McNeese State were all designated as conference games and counted in the Gulf South standings.

Schedule

Date	Time	Opponent	Site	Result	Attendance	Source
September 8		vs. East Texas State*	State Fair Stadium; Shreveport, LA	W 24–0	7,000	
September 15		Southwestern State (OK)	Demon Stadium; Natchitoches, LA	W 23–7	8,000	
September 12		at Bishop*	Tiger Stadium; Dallas, TX	W 28–7	2,500	
September 29		Northeast Louisiana	Demon Stadium; Natchitoches, LA	L 13–16	9,500	
October 6		at Nicholls State	John L. Guidry Stadium; Thibodaux, LA (rivalry)	L 0–3	9,000	
October 13	7:30 p.m.	Florence State	Demon Stadium; Natchitoches, LA	W 27–14	6,000	
October 20		vs. No. 8 Louisiana Tech*	State Fair Stadium; Shreveport, LA (rivalry)	L 7–26	33,000	
November 3		McNeese State	Demon Stadium; Natchitoches, LA (rivalry)	L 0–14	9,800	
November 10		at Southwestern Louisiana*	Cajun Field; Lafayette, LA	W 20–10	16,000	
November 17		at Southeastern Louisiana	Strawberry Field; Hammond, LA	W 21–14	5,000	
November 22		at Delta State	Delta Field; Cleveland, MS	L 6–31		
*Non-conference game; Rankings from AP Poll released prior to the game; All times are in Central time

== 1974 ==
1974 Northwestern State Demons football
- Conference: Gulf South Conference
- Record: 1–10 (1–6 GSC)
- Head coach: George Doherty (3rd season)
- Home stadium: Demon Stadium

1974 Gulf South Conference football standings
	Conf.					Overall
Team	W		L		T	W		L		T
No. 7 Jacksonville State $	7	–	1	–	0	7	–	4	–	0
Delta State	7	–	2	–	0	8	–	3	–	0
No. 8 Livingston	5	–	3	–	0	8	–	3	–	0
Southeastern Louisiana	5	–	3	–	0	6	–	4	–	0
Troy State	4	–	4	–	0	6	–	4	–	0
North Alabama	4	–	4	–	0	4	–	6	–	0
Nicholls State	4	–	5	–	0	5	–	6	–	0
Northwestern State	1	–	6	–	0	1	–	10	–	0
Tennessee–Martin	1	–	7	–	0	2	–	9	–	0
Mississippi College	0	–	7	–	0	2	–	9	–	0
$ – Conference champion; Rankings from NAIA Division I poll

The 1974 Northwestern State Demons football team was an American football team that represented Northwestern State University as a member of the Gulf South Conference (GSC) during the 1974 NCAA Division II football season. In their third year under head coach George Doherty, the team compiled an overall record of 1–10 with a mark of 1–6 in conference play, and finished eighth in the GSC. Northwestern State played their home games on campus at Demon Stadium in Natchitoches, Louisiana.

Their games against Stephen F. Austin and McNeese State were designated as conference games and counted in the Gulf South standings.

The 1974 season also marked the final one Northwestern State competed as a member of the GSC. The school withdrew from the conference in July 1975 in order to start the transition to Division I as the GSC remained as a Division II conference.

Schedule

Date	Opponent	Site	Result	Attendance	Source
September 7	at Troy State	Rip Hewes Stadium; Dothan, AL	L 6–28	7,500	
September 14	vs. Grambling State*	State Fair Stadium; Shreveport, LA	L 13–14	25,000	
September 21	Stephen F. Austin	Demon Stadium; Natchitoches, LA (rivalry)	L 13–14	8,500	
September 28	Delta State	Demon Stadium; Natchitoches, LA	L 7–35	6,000	
October 5	at Northeast Louisiana*	Brown Stadium; Monroe, LA	L 8–14	8,400	
October 12	Nicholls State	Demon Stadium; Natchitoches, LA (rivalry)	L 0–7	5,000	
October 19	vs. No. 1 Louisiana Tech*	State Fair Stadium; Shreveport, LA (rivalry)	L 0–34	26,000	
October 26	at Jacksonville State	Paul Snow Stadium; Jacksonville, AL	L 13–36	10,125	
November 9	at No. 12 McNeese State	Cowboy Stadium; Lake Charles, LA (rivalry)	L 7–17	8,750	
November 16	Southwestern Louisiana*	Demon Stadium; Natchitoches, LA	L 10–14	4,000	
November 23	Southeastern Louisiana	Demon Stadium; Natchitoches, LA	W 40–3	2,000	
*Non-conference game; Rankings from AP Poll released prior to the game

== 1975 ==
1975 Northwestern State Demons football
- Conference: Independent
- Record: 1–10
- Head coach: A. L. Williams (1st season)
- Home stadium: State Fair Stadium

1975 NCAA Division II independents football records
	Conf.			Overall
Team	W	L	T	W		L		T
No. 2 Northern Michigan ^		–		13	–	1	–	0
American International		–		8	–	1	–	0
Lehigh ^		–		9	–	3	–	0
Delaware		–		8	–	3	–	0
Portland State		–		8	–	3	–	0
Akron		–		7	–	4	–	0
Kentucky State		–		7	–	4	–	0
UNLV		–		7	–	4	–	0
Santa Clara		–		6	–	5	–	0
Tennessee State		–		5	–	4	–	0
Youngstown State		–		5	–	4	–	0
Chattanooga		–		5	–	5	–	1
Bucknell		–		5	–	5	–	0
Indiana State		–		5	–	5	–	0
Lafayette		–		5	–	5	–	0
Southern Connecticut State		–		5	–	5	–	0
Central Connecticut		–		4	–	5	–	0
Central State (OH)		–		4	–	6	–	0
Eastern Michigan		–		4	–	6	–	0
Eastern Illinois		–		3	–	5	–	2
Illinois College		–		3	–	6	–	0
Northeastern		–		3	–	6	–	0
Western Carolina		–		3	–	7	–	0
Nevada		–		3	–	8	–	0
Illinois State		–		2	–	7	–	1
Nebraska–Omaha		–		2	–	9	–	0
Arkansas–Pine Bluff		–		0	–	11	–	0
^ – NCAA Division II playoff participant; Rankings from AP Poll

The 1975 Northwestern State Demons football team was an American football team that represented Northwestern State University as an independent during the 1975 NCAA Division II football season. In their first year under head coach A. L. Williams, the team compiled an overall record of 1–10. Due to the demolition of Demon Stadium, and construction of a new stadium on the same site, Northwestern State played their home games off-campus at State Fair Stadium in Shreveport, Louisiana. This was the first season the Demons competed as an independent after they withdrew from the Gulf South Conference in July 1975.

In November 1974, Williams was promoted to head coach after a single season as an offensive assistant coach for the Demons. He was promoted as the successor to George Doherty who resigned as head coach to and remained at Northwestern State as its athletic director after having served in both positions.

Schedule

Date	Opponent	Site	Result	Attendance	Source
September 6	at Arkansas State	Indian Stadium; Jonesboro, AR	L 0–42	13,513	
September 20	at Stephen F. Austin	Lumberjack Stadium; Nacogdoches, TX (rivalry)	L 13–17	10,500	
September 27	at Delta State	Delta Field; Cleveland, MS	W 14–12	5,420	
October 4	Northeast Louisiana	State Fair Stadium; Shreveport, LA	L 20–34	5,060	
October 11	at Nicholls State	John L. Guidry Stadium; Thibodaux, LA (rivalry)	L 10–23	11,000	
October 18	Louisiana Tech	State Fair Stadium; Shreveport, LA (rivalry)	L 14–41	26,496	
October 25	Jacksonville State	State Fair Stadium; Shreveport, LA	L 0–21	382	
November 1	Troy State	State Fair Stadium; Shreveport, LA	L 0–24	792	
November 8	at McNeese State	Cowboy Stadium; Lake Charles, LA (rivalry)	L 14–31	12,000	
November 15	at Southwestern Louisiana	Cajun Field; Lafayette, LA	L 17–40	15,175	
November 22	at Southeastern Louisiana	Strawberry Field; Hammond, LA	L 6–31	2,500	

== 1976 ==
1976 Northwestern State Demons football
- Conference: Independent
- Record: 5–5
- Head coach: A. L. Williams (2nd season)
- Home stadium: Harry Turpin Stadium

1976 NCAA Division II independents football records
	Conf.			Overall
Team	W	L	T	W		L		T
No. 2 Northern Michigan ^		–		11	–	2	–	0
No. 3 Akron ^		–		10	–	3	–	0
No. 7 UNLV ^		–		9	–	3	–	0
No. 4 Delaware ^		–		8	–	3	–	1
Nevada		–		8	–	3	–	0
Portland State		–		8	–	3	–	0
Tennessee State		–		7	–	2	–	1
American International		–		6	–	3	–	0
Northern Colorado		–		6	–	3	–	0
Madison		–		7	–	4	–	0
Santa Clara		–		7	–	4	–	0
Western Carolina		–		6	–	4	–	0
Chattanooga		–		6	–	4	–	1
Southern Connecticut State		–		5	–	4	–	0
Central State (OH)		–		6	–	5	–	0
Lehigh		–		6	–	5	–	0
Arkansas–Pine Bluff		–		5	–	5	–	0
Central Connecticut		–		5	–	5	–	0
Illinois College		–		4	–	4	–	1
Lafayette		–		5	–	5	–	0
Eastern Illinois		–		5	–	6	–	0
Bucknell		–		4	–	5	–	0
Youngstown State		–		4	–	6	–	0
Kentucky State		–		3	–	7	–	1
Nebraska–Omaha		–		3	–	8	–	0
Northeastern		–		2	–	7	–	0
^ – NCAA Division II playoff participant; Rankings from Associated Press poll

The 1976 Northwestern State Demons football team was an American football team that represented Northwestern State University as an independent during the 1976 NCAA Division II football season. In their second year under head coach A. L. Williams, the team compiled an overall record of 5–5.

The 1976 season marked the first Northwestern State played their home games on campus at Harry Turpin Stadium in Natchitoches, Louisiana. The stadium was constructed at the same location of the previous Demon Stadium that has served as the home field for Northwestern State since 1939. While Turpin Stadium was under construction, the Demons played their home games off campus at State Fair Stadium for their 1975 season.

Schedule

Date	Opponent	Site	Result	Attendance	Source
September 11	at Lamar	Cardinal Stadium; Beaumont, TX	L 6–17		
September 18	Stephen F. Austin	Harry Turpin Stadium; Natchitoches, LA (rivalry)	W 47–0	9,000	
September 25	Delta State	Harry Turpin Stadium; Natchitoches, LA	W 17–7	18,000	
October 2	at Arkansas State	Indian Stadium; Jonesboro, AR	L 24–44	12,715	
October 9	Nicholls State	Harry Turpin Stadium; Natchitoches, LA (rivalry)	W 20–8	9,000	
October 23	vs. Louisiana Tech	State Fair Stadium; Shreveport, LA (rivalry)	L 6–35	24,200	
October 30	at Northeast Louisiana	Brown Stadium; Monroe, LA	W 21–9		
November 6	at McNeese State	Cowboy Stadium; Lake Charles, LA (rivalry)	L 15–24	12,000	
November 13	Southwestern Louisiana	Harry Turpin Stadium; Natchitoches, LA	W 7–3	1,500	
November 20	Southeastern Louisiana	Harry Turpin Stadium; Natchitoches, LA	L 27–34	4,000	

== 1977 ==
1977 Northwestern State Demons football
- Conference: Independent
- Record: 6–5
- Head coach: A. L. Williams (3rd season)
- Home stadium: Harry Turpin Stadium

1977 NCAA Division I independents football records
	Conf.					Overall
Team	W		L		T	W		L		T
No. 1 Notre Dame		–		–		11	–	1	–	0
No. 5 Penn State		–		–		11	–	1	–	0
Colgate		–		–		10	–	1	–	0
North Texas State *		–		–		10	–	1	–	0
No. 16 San Diego State		–		–		10	–	1	–	0
Tennessee State		–		–		8	–	1	–	1
No. 14 Florida State		–		–		10	–	2	–	0
No. 8 Pittsburgh		–		–		9	–	2	–	1
East Carolina		–		–		8	–	3	–	0
Rutgers		–		–		8	–	3	–	0
Army		–		–		7	–	4	–	0
Louisville		–		–		7	–	4	–	1
Boston College		–		–		6	–	5	–	0
Cincinnati		–		–		5	–	4	–	2
Georgia Tech		–		–		6	–	5	–	0
Memphis State		–		–		6	–	5	–	0
Northwestern State		–		–		6	–	5	–	0
Syracuse		–		–		6	–	5	–	0
William & Mary		–		–		6	–	5	–	0
Southern Miss		–		–		6	–	5	–	0
Temple		–		–		5	–	5	–	1
Hawaii		–		–		5	–	6	–	0
Navy		–		–		5	–	6	–	0
West Virginia		–		–		5	–	6	–	0
South Carolina		–		–		5	–	7	–	0
Utah State		–		–		4	–	7	–	0
Villanova		–		–		4	–	7	–	0
Illinois State		–		–		3	–	7	–	1
Virginia Tech		–		–		3	–	7	–	1
Miami (FL)		–		–		3	–	8	–	0
Richmond		–		–		3	–	8	–	0
Tulane		–		–		3	–	8	–	0
Air Force		–		–		2	–	8	–	1
Holy Cross		–		–		2	–	8	–	0
Northeast Louisiana		–		–		2	–	9	–	0
North Texas State (originally 9–2) awarded a forfeit win after Mississippi State was found to be using an ineligible player.; Rankings from AP Poll

The 1977 Northwestern State Demons football team was an American football team that represented Northwestern State University as an independent during the 1977 NCAA Division I football season. Led by third-year head coach A. L. Williams, the Demons compiled a 6–5 record. Northwestern State played their home games on campus at Harry Turpin Stadium in Natchitoches, Louisiana.

Schedule

Date	Opponent	Site	Result	Attendance	Source
September 3	UT Arlington	Harry Turpin Stadium; Natchitoches, LA	W 28–24	12,100	
September 10	at Cincinnati	Nippert Stadium; Cincinnati, OH	L 0–41	8,926	
September 17	Arkansas State	Harry Turpin Stadium; Natchitoches, LA	W 30–7		
September 24	at Stephen F. Austin	Lumberjack Stadium; Nacogdoches, TX (rivalry)	W 20–6		
October 1	Northeast Louisiana	Harry Turpin Stadium; Natchitoches, LA (rivalry)	W 13–0	11,655	
October 8	at Nicholls State	John L. Guidry Stadium; Thibodaux, LA (rivalry)	L 6–10	6,379	
October 15	Lamar	Harry Turpin Stadium; Natchitoches, LA	W 43–0		
October 22	vs. Louisiana Tech	State Fair Stadium; Shreveport, LA (rivalry)	L 8–30	32,000	
November 5	McNeese State	Harry Turpin Stadium; Natchitoches, LA (rivalry)	L 7–14		
November 12	at Southwestern Louisiana	Cajun Field; Lafayette, LA	W 20–13	28,722	
November 19	at Southeastern Louisiana	Strawberry Stadium; Hammond, LA (rivalry)	L 21–38		

== 1978 ==
1978 Northwestern State Demons football
- Conference: Independent
- Record: 5–6
- Head coach: A. L. Williams (4th season)
- Home stadium: Harry Turpin Stadium

1978 NCAA Division I-AA independents football standings
	Conf.			Overall
Team	W	L	T	W		L		T
No. 1 Nevada ^		–		11	–	1	–	0
No. 9 Lehigh		–		8	–	3	–	0
Northeastern		–		6	–	5	–	0
Bucknell		–		5	–	5	–	0
Northwestern State		–		5	–	6	–	0
Portland State		–		5	–	6	–	0
Lafayette		–		4	–	7	–	0
^ – NCAA Division I-AA playoff participant; Rankings from Associated Press poll

The 1978 Northwestern State Demons football team was an American football team that represented Northwestern State University as an independent during the 1978 NCAA Division I-AA football season. Led by fourth-year head coach A. L. Williams, the Demons compiled a 5–6 record. Northwestern State played their home games on campus at Harry Turpin Stadium in Natchitoches, Louisiana.

Schedule

Date	Opponent	Site	Result	Attendance	Source
September 9	Lamar	Harry Turpin Stadium; Natchitoches, LA	W 21–17	9,500	
September 16	at Stephen F. Austin	Lumberjack Stadium; Nacogdoches, TX (rivalry)	W 21–14		
September 23	McNeese State	Harry Turpin Stadium; Natchitoches, LA (rivalry)	W 10–7		
September 30	at Northeast Louisiana	Malone Stadium; Monroe, LA (rivalry)	L 0–46	15,100	
October 7	at Arkansas State	Indian Stadium; Jonesboro, AR	L 14–23		
October 14	at Louisville	Fairgrounds Stadium; Louisville, KY	L 7–51	13,372	
October 21	vs. Louisiana Tech	State Fair Stadium; Shreveport, LA (rivalry)	L 20–45	21,000	
October 28	Nicholls State	Harry Turpin Stadium; Natchitoches, LA (rivalry)	W 28–18	8,100	
November 4	at UT Arlington	Cravens Field; Arlington, TX	L 7–30	5,551	
November 11	Southwestern Louisiana	Harry Turpin Stadium; Natchitoches, LA	L 17–19		
November 18	Southeastern Louisiana	Harry Turpin Stadium; Natchitoches, LA (rivalry)	W 13–12		

== 1979 ==
1979 Northwestern State Demons football
- Conference: Independent
- Record: 3–6
- Head coach: A. L. Williams (5th season)
- Home stadium: Harry Turpin Stadium

1979 NCAA Division I-AA independents football standings
	Conf.			Overall
Team	W	L	T	W		L		T
No. 4 Lehigh ^		–		10	–	3	–	0
Florida A&M		–		7	–	4	–	0
Portland State		–		6	–	5	–	0
Lafayette		–		5	–	3	–	2
Bucknell		–		4	–	4	–	2
Northwestern State		–		3	–	6	–	0
Northeastern		–		3	–	7	–	0
^ – NCAA Division I-AA playoff participant; Rankings from Associated Press poll

The 1979 Northwestern State Demons football team was an American football team that represented Northwestern State University as an independent during the 1979 NCAA Division I-AA football season. Led by fifth-year head coach A. L. Williams, the Demons compiled a 3–6 record. Northwestern State played their home games on campus at Harry Turpin Stadium in Natchitoches, Louisiana.

Schedule

Date	Opponent	Site	Result	Attendance	Source
September 15	Stephen F. Austin	Harry Turpin Stadium; Natchitoches, LA (rivalry)	W 27–21		
September 22	at UT Arlington	Cravens Field; Arlington, TX	L 14–37	6,488	
September 29	Northeast Louisiana	Harry Turpin Stadium; Natchitoches, LA (rivalry)	W 20–14	12,989	
October 13	at Southeastern Louisiana	Strawberry Stadium; Hammond, LA (rivalry)	L 7–33		
October 20	vs. Louisiana Tech*	State Fair Stadium; Shreveport, LA (rivalry)	W 25–21	19,212	
October 27	at Nicholls State	John L. Guidry Stadium; Thibodaux, LA (rivalry)	L 24–27		
November 3	at McNeese State	Cowboy Stadium; Lake Charles, LA (rivalry)	L 13–44	19,875	
November 10	at Lamar	Cardinal Stadium; Beaumont, TX	L 13–28		
November 17	Central Michigan	Harry Turpin Stadium; Natchitoches, LA	L 0–28	6,700	
*Non-conference game
