= 1977 Lamar Cardinals football team =

American college football season

1977 Lamar Cardinals football
- Conference: Southland Conference
- Record: 2–9 (1–4 Southland)
- Head coach: Bob Frederick (2nd season)
- Home stadium: Cardinal Stadium

1977 Southland Conference football standings
	Conf.					Overall
Team	W		L		T	W		L		T
Louisiana Tech $	4	–	0	–	1	9	–	1	–	2
Southwestern Louisiana	2	–	1	–	2	6	–	4	–	2
UT Arlington	3	–	2	–	0	5	–	6	–	0
Arkansas State	2	–	3	–	0	7	–	4	–	0
McNeese State	1	–	3	–	1	5	–	5	–	1
Lamar	1	–	4	–	0	2	–	9	–	0
$ – Conference champion

The 1977 Lamar Cardinals football team represented Lamar University in the 1977 NCAA Division I football season as a member of the Southland Conference. The Cardinals played their home games at Cardinal Stadium now named Provost Umphrey Stadium in Beaumont, Texas. Lamar finished the 1977 season with a 2–9 overall record and a 1–4 conference record. One highlight for the season was that the game against the Southwestern Louisiana Ragin' Cajuns was the fifth-highest-attended game in the history of the stadium, with 17,222 fans in attendance.

== Schedule ==
Date	Opponent	Site	Result	Attendance	Source
September 10	Northeast Louisiana*	Cardinal Stadium; Beaumont, TX	W 21–7		
September 17	Southwestern Louisiana	Cardinal Stadium; Beaumont, TX (rivalry)	L 6–10	17,222	
September 24	at Long Beach State*	Veterans Memorial Stadium; Long Beach, CA	L 7–21	5,444	
October 1	at Southern Illinois*	McAndrew Stadium; Carbondale, IL	L 5–9	13,723	
October 8	Arkansas State	Cardinal Stadium; Beaumont, TX	L 6–10		
October 15	at Northwestern State*	Harry Turpin Stadium; Natchitoches, LA	L 0–43		
October 22	West Texas State*	Cardinal Stadium; Beaumont, TX	L 9–27	3,000	
October 29	at Drake*	Drake Stadium; Des Moines, IA	L 21–43	7,140	
November 5	Louisiana Tech	Cardinal Stadium; Beaumont, TX	L 6–23	7,129	
November 12	at McNeese State	Cowboy Stadium; Lake Charles, LA (Battle of the Border)	W 35–7		
November 19	at UT Arlington	Cravens Field; Arlington, TX	L 7–14	1,756	
*Non-conference game
