= 1977 New Mexico State Aggies football team =

American college football season

1977 New Mexico State Aggies football
- Conference: Missouri Valley Conference
- Record: 4–7 (3–2 MVC)
- Head coach: Jim Bradley (5th season)
- Home stadium: Memorial Stadium

1977 Missouri Valley Conference football standings
	Conf.					Overall
Team	W		L		T	W		L		T
West Texas State $	5	–	1	–	0	6	–	4	–	1
Wichita State	4	–	1	–	0	5	–	6	–	0
New Mexico State	3	–	2	–	0	4	–	7	–	0
Indiana State	2	–	3	–	0	3	–	7	–	0
Tulsa	2	–	3	–	0	3	–	8	–	0
Drake	1	–	5	–	0	2	–	9	–	0
Southern Illinois	0	–	5	–	0	3	–	8	–	0
$ – Conference champion; Tulsa, Indiana State, and Southern Illinois played designated conference games.

The 1977 New Mexico State Aggies football team was an American football team that represented New Mexico State University in the Missouri Valley Conference (MVC) during the 1977 NCAA Division I football season. In their fifth year under head coach Jim Bradley, the Aggies compiled a 4–7 record. The team played home games at Memorial Stadium in Las Cruces, New Mexico.

== Schedule ==
Date	Opponent	Site	Result	Attendance	Source
September 3	Southern Illinois	Memorial Stadium; Las Cruces, NM	W 29–7	11,044	
September 10	at Arkansas*	War Memorial Stadium; Little Rock, AR	L 10–53	53,167	
September 17	Wichita State	Memorial Stadium; Las Cruces, NM	W 24–12	11,406	
September 24	Drake	Memorial Stadium; Las Cruces, NM	W 35–9	11,850	
October 1	at UTEP*	Sun Bowl; El Paso, TX (rivalry)	L 21–23	22,375	
October 8	West Texas State	Memorial Stadium; Las Cruces, NM	L 14–17	11,879	
October 22	at UT Arlington*	Cravens Field; Arlington, TX	W 7–6	4,500	
October 29	New Mexico*	Memorial Stadium; Las Cruces, NM (rivalry)	L 13–35	14,250	
November 5	at North Texas State*	Fouts Field; Denton, TX	L 17–45	18,500	
November 12	at Tulsa	Skelly Stadium; Tulsa, OK	L 24–27	11,384	
November 19	Idaho*	Memorial Stadium; Las Cruces, NM	L 44–47	6,438	
*Non-conference game
