= Bill Yung =

American football coach

Biographical details
- Born: 1934 (age 91–92)

Coaching career (HC unless noted)
- 1969–1971: Grand Prairie HS (TX)
- 1972–1973: Baylor (OL)
- 1974–1976: Baylor (OC)
- 1977–1981: West Texas State
- 1982–1985: UTEP

Head coaching record
- Overall: 33–66–2 (college)

Accomplishments and honors

Championships
- 2 MVC (1977, 1979)

Bill Yung (born 1934) is an American former football coach. He served as the head football coach at West Texas State University—now West Texas A&M University—from 1977 to 1981 and at the University of Texas at El Paso (UTEP) from 1982 to 1985, compiling a career college football record of 33–66–2.

== Coaching career ==
After three seasons as head coach at Grand Prairie High School in Grand Prairie, Texas, Yung became an assistant under Grant Teaff at Baylor University. Prior to the 1974 season he was appointed to offensive coordinator. From 1977 to 1981, he served as the head football coach at West Texas A&M University. During that tenure, he compiled a 26–27–2 record.

From 1982 to 1985, he coached at the University of Texas at El Paso (UTEP) with a record of 7–39. His overall college football coaching record was 33–66–2. His offensive coordinator at UTEP was Hal Mumme, a pioneer of the passing game. Mumme had also served as Yung's offensive backfield coach at West Texas.

After coaching, Yung became vice president of a disability insurance company.

== Head coaching record ==
=== College ===
Year	Team	Overall	Conference	Standing	Bowl/playoffs
West Texas State Buffaloes (Missouri Valley Conference) (1977–1981)
1977	West Texas State	6–4–1	5–1	1st	
1978	West Texas State	3–8	1–5	7th	
1979	West Texas State	5–5–1	5–0	1st	
1980	West Texas State	5–6	2–4	5th	
1981	West Texas State	7–4	3–3	T–4th	
West Texas A&M:		26–27–2	16–13		
UTEP Miners (Western Athletic Conference) (1982–1985)
1982	UTEP	2–10	1–6	9th	
1983	UTEP	2–10	0–8	9th	
1984	UTEP	2–9	1–7	T–8th	
1985	UTEP	1–10	1–7	9th	
UTEP:		7–39	3–28		
Total:		33–66–2			
National championship Conference title Conference division title or championship game berth
