= 1977 UT Arlington Mavericks football team =

American college football season

1977 UT Arlington Mavericks football
- Conference: Southland Conference
- Record: 5–6 (3–2 Southland)
- Head coach: Harold Elliott (4th season)
- Home stadium: Cravens Field

1977 Southland Conference football standings
	Conf.					Overall
Team	W		L		T	W		L		T
Louisiana Tech $	4	–	0	–	1	9	–	1	–	2
Southwestern Louisiana	2	–	1	–	2	6	–	4	–	2
UT Arlington	3	–	2	–	0	5	–	6	–	0
Arkansas State	2	–	3	–	0	7	–	4	–	0
McNeese State	1	–	3	–	1	5	–	5	–	1
Lamar	1	–	4	–	0	2	–	9	–	0
$ – Conference champion

The 1977 UT Arlington Mavericks football team was an American football team that represented the University of Texas at Arlington in the Southland Conference during the 1977 NCAA Division I football season. In their fourth year under head coach Harold Elliott, the team compiled a 5–6 record.

== Schedule ==
Date	Opponent	Site	Result	Attendance	Source
September 3	at Northwestern State*	Harry Turpin Stadium; Natchitoches, LA	L 24–28	12,100	
September 17	at Western Michigan*	Waldo Stadium; Kalamazoo, MI	W 17–10	16,900	
September 24	at Southwestern Louisiana	Cajun Field; Lafayette, LA	L 20–30	24,950	
October 1	at West Texas State*	Kimbrough Memorial Stadium; Canyon, TX	W 17–13	13,850	
October 8	McNeese State	Cravens Field; Arlington, TX	W 24–7	6,500	
October 15	vs. North Texas State*	Texas Stadium; Irving, TX	L 6–15	12,300	
October 22	New Mexico State*	Cravens Field; Arlington, TX	L 6–7	4,500	
October 29	at Louisiana Tech	Joe Aillet Stadium; Ruston, LA	L 12–34	16,200	
November 5	Southern Miss*	Cravens Field; Arlington, TX	L 3–20	5,200	
November 12	at Arkansas State	Indian Stadium; Jonesboro, AR	W 44–14	5,391	
November 19	Lamar	Cravens Field; Arlington, TX	W 14–7	1,756	
*Non-conference game

== Roster ==
1977 Texas–Arlington Mavericks football team roster
Players			Coaches
Offense: Pos. / # / Name / Class; RB / 31 / Derrick Jensen / Sr	Defense: Pos. / # / Name / Class; LB / 66 / Cliff Odom / Jr	Special teams: Pos. / # / Name / Class	Head coach: Harold Elliott; Coordinators/assistant coaches Legend: (C) Team captain; (S) Suspended; (I) Ineligible; Injured; Redshirt
