= 1977 Arkansas State Indians football team =

American college football season

1977 Arkansas State Indians football
- Conference: Southland Conference
- Record: 7–4 (2–3 Southland)
- Head coach: Bill Davidson (7th season)
- Home stadium: Indian Stadium

1977 Southland Conference football standings
	Conf.					Overall
Team	W		L		T	W		L		T
Louisiana Tech $	4	–	0	–	1	9	–	1	–	2
Southwestern Louisiana	2	–	1	–	2	6	–	4	–	2
UT Arlington	3	–	2	–	0	5	–	6	–	0
Arkansas State	2	–	3	–	0	7	–	4	–	0
McNeese State	1	–	3	–	1	5	–	5	–	1
Lamar	1	–	4	–	0	2	–	9	–	0
$ – Conference champion

The 1977 Arkansas State Indians football team represented Arkansas State University as a member of the Southland Conference during the 1977 NCAA Division I football season. Led by seventh-year head coach Bill Davidson, the Indians compiled an overall record of 7–4 with a mark of 2–3 in conference, placing fourth in the Southland.

== Schedule ==
Date	Opponent	Site	Result	Attendance	Source
September 10	at Drake*	Drake Stadium; Des Moines, IA	W 31–29	11,100	
September 17	at Northwestern State*	Harry Turpin Stadium; Natchitoches, LA	L 7–30		
September 24	Southern Illinois*	Indian Stadium; Jonesboro, AR	W 21–6	10,957	
October 1	East Texas State*	Indian Stadium; Jonesboro, AR	W 18–17		
October 8	at Lamar	Cardinal Stadium; Beaumont, TX	W 10–6		
October 15	Louisiana Tech	Indian Stadium; Jonesboro, AR	L 7–20	15,128	
October 22	at McNeese State	Cowboy Stadium; Lake Charles, LA	L 14–17		
October 29	at Northeast Louisiana*	Brown Stadium; Monroe, LA	W 31–20		
November 5	Southwestern Louisiana^{†}	Indian Stadium; Jonesboro, AR	W 17–15	10,041	
November 12	UT Arlington	Indian Stadium; Jonesboro, AR	L 14–44	5,391	
November 19	at Southern Miss*	M. M. Roberts Stadium; Hattiesburg, MS	W 14–10	9,216	
*Non-conference game; ^{†}Homecoming
