= 1977 Indiana State Sycamores football team =

American college football season

1977 Indiana State Sycamores football
- Conference: Missouri Valley Conference
- Record: 3–7 (2–3 MVC)
- Head coach: Tom Harp (5th season)
- Home stadium: Memorial Stadium

1977 Missouri Valley Conference football standings
	Conf.					Overall
Team	W		L		T	W		L		T
West Texas State $	5	–	1	–	0	6	–	4	–	1
Wichita State	4	–	1	–	0	5	–	6	–	0
New Mexico State	3	–	2	–	0	4	–	7	–	0
Indiana State	2	–	3	–	0	3	–	7	–	0
Tulsa	2	–	3	–	0	3	–	8	–	0
Drake	1	–	5	–	0	2	–	9	–	0
Southern Illinois	0	–	5	–	0	3	–	8	–	0
$ – Conference champion; Tulsa, Indiana State, and Southern Illinois played designated conference games.

The 1977 Indiana State Sycamores football team was an American football team that represented Indiana State University as a member of the Missouri Valley Conference (MVC) during the 1977 NCAA Division I football season. In their fifth year under head coach Tom Harp, the team compiled an overall record of 3–7 record (2–3 in conference games), tied for fourth in the MVC, and were outscored by a total of 240 to 149.

On offense, the Sycamores tallied an average of 183.3 rushing yards and 85.4 passing yards. On defense, they gave up an average of 222.6 rushing yards and 133.6 passing yards. Running back Vincent Allen led the team with 1,026 rushing yards and 48 points scored. Allen also tallied 20 receptions for 58 yards. Quarterback Pete McCoy passed for 697 yards, but threw 11 interceptions and had an 82.4 passer rating.

The team played its home games at Memorial Stadium in Terre Haute, Indiana.

== Schedule ==
Date	Opponent	Site	Result	Attendance	Source
September 10	at McNeese State (Note: Designated conference game)	Cowboy Stadium; Lake Charles, LA	L 7–25	20,000	
September 17	at Southern Illinois	McAndrew Stadium; Carbondale, IL	W 14–9	13,458	
September 24	Western Carolina*	Memorial Stadium; Terre Haute, IN	L 14–15	13,800	
October 1	at Akron*	Rubber Bowl; Akron, OH	L 3–20	11,678	
October 8	at Drake	Drake Stadium; Des Moines, IA	W 23–20	7,417	
October 22	Illinois State*^{†}	Memorial Stadium; Terre Haute, IN	W 20–10	16,836	
October 29	at West Texas State	Kimbrough Memorial Stadium; Canyon, TX	L 20–31		
November 5	Ball State*	Memorial Stadium; Terre Haute, IN (rivalry)	L 18–42	6,120	
November 12	Wichita State	Memorial Stadium; Terre Haute, IN	L 14–41	6,270	
November 20	at Louisville*	Fairgrounds Stadium; Louisville, KY	L 16–27	11,847	
*Non-conference game; ^{†}Homecoming
