= 1977 West Texas State Buffaloes football team =

American college football season

1977 West Texas State Buffaloes football

MVC champion
- Conference: Missouri Valley Conference
- Record: 6–4–1 (5–1 MVC)
- Head coach: Bill Yung (1st season)
- Home stadium: Kimbrough Memorial Stadium

1977 Missouri Valley Conference football standings
	Conf.					Overall
Team	W		L		T	W		L		T
West Texas State $	5	–	1	–	0	6	–	4	–	1
Wichita State	4	–	1	–	0	5	–	6	–	0
New Mexico State	3	–	2	–	0	4	–	7	–	0
Indiana State	2	–	3	–	0	3	–	7	–	0
Tulsa	2	–	3	–	0	3	–	8	–	0
Drake	1	–	5	–	0	2	–	9	–	0
Southern Illinois	0	–	5	–	0	3	–	8	–	0
$ – Conference champion; Tulsa, Indiana State, and Southern Illinois played designated conference games.

The 1977 West Texas State Buffaloes football team was an American football team that represented West Texas State University—now known as West Texas A&M University—as a member of the Missouri Valley Conference during the 1977 NCAA Division I football season. In their first year under head coach Bill Yung, the Buffaloes compiled an overall record of 6–4–1 with a mark of 5–1 in conference play, winning the MVC title.

== Schedule ==
Date	Opponent	Site	Result	Attendance	Source
September 3	at Wichita State	Cessna Stadium; Wichita, KS	L 10–14	21,924	
September 17	at McNeese State*	Cowboy Stadium; Lake Charles, LA	L 8–20		
September 24	at North Texas State*	Fouts Field; Denton, TX	L 20–31	16,500	
October 1	UT Arlington*	Kimbrough Memorial Stadium; Canyon, TX	L 13–17	13,850	
October 8	at New Mexico State	Memorial Stadium; Las Cruces, NM	W 17–14	11,879	
October 15	Drake^{†}	Kimbrough Memorial Stadium; Canyon, TX	W 31–7		
October 22	at Lamar*	Cardinal Stadium; Beaumont, TX	W 27–9	3,000	
October 29	Indiana State	Kimbrough Memorial Stadium; Canyon, TX	W 31–20		
November 12	Colorado State*	Kimbrough Memorial Stadium; Canyon, TX	T 21–21		
November 19	Tulsa	Kimbrough Memorial Stadium; Canyon, TX	W 57–21	6,300	
November 26	Southern Illinois	Kimbrough Memorial Stadium; Canyon, TX	W 28–9	7,750	
*Non-conference game; ^{†}Homecoming
