= 1977 Southern Miss Golden Eagles football team =

American college football season

1977 Southern Miss Golden Eagles football
- Conference: Independent
- Record: 6–6
- Head coach: Bobby Collins (3rd season)
- Home stadium: M. M. Roberts Stadium

1977 NCAA Division I independents football records
| | Conf. | | | | | Overall |
| Team | W | | L | | T | W | | L | | T |
|---|---|---|---|---|---|---|---|---|---|---|
| No. 1 Notre Dame | | – | | – | | 11 | – | 1 | – | 0 |
| No. 5 Penn State | | – | | – | | 11 | – | 1 | – | 0 |
| Colgate | | – | | – | | 10 | – | 1 | – | 0 |
| North Texas State * | | – | | – | | 10 | – | 1 | – | 0 |
| No. 16 San Diego State | | – | | – | | 10 | – | 1 | – | 0 |
| Tennessee State | | – | | – | | 8 | – | 1 | – | 1 |
| No. 14 Florida State | | – | | – | | 10 | – | 2 | – | 0 |
| No. 8 Pittsburgh | | – | | – | | 9 | – | 2 | – | 1 |
| East Carolina | | – | | – | | 8 | – | 3 | – | 0 |
| Rutgers | | – | | – | | 8 | – | 3 | – | 0 |
| Army | | – | | – | | 7 | – | 4 | – | 0 |
| Louisville | | – | | – | | 7 | – | 4 | – | 1 |
| Boston College | | – | | – | | 6 | – | 5 | – | 0 |
| Cincinnati | | – | | – | | 5 | – | 4 | – | 2 |
| Georgia Tech | | – | | – | | 6 | – | 5 | – | 0 |
| Memphis State | | – | | – | | 6 | – | 5 | – | 0 |
| Northwestern State | | – | | – | | 6 | – | 5 | – | 0 |
| Syracuse | | – | | – | | 6 | – | 5 | – | 0 |
| William & Mary | | – | | – | | 6 | – | 5 | – | 0 |
| Southern Miss | | – | | – | | 6 | – | 5 | – | 0 |
| Temple | | – | | – | | 5 | – | 5 | – | 1 |
| Hawaii | | – | | – | | 5 | – | 6 | – | 0 |
| Navy | | – | | – | | 5 | – | 6 | – | 0 |
| West Virginia | | – | | – | | 5 | – | 6 | – | 0 |
| South Carolina | | – | | – | | 5 | – | 7 | – | 0 |
| Utah State | | – | | – | | 4 | – | 7 | – | 0 |
| Villanova | | – | | – | | 4 | – | 7 | – | 0 |
| Illinois State | | – | | – | | 3 | – | 7 | – | 1 |
| Virginia Tech | | – | | – | | 3 | – | 7 | – | 1 |
| Miami (FL) | | – | | – | | 3 | – | 8 | – | 0 |
| Richmond | | – | | – | | 3 | – | 8 | – | 0 |
| Tulane | | – | | – | | 3 | – | 8 | – | 0 |
| Air Force | | – | | – | | 2 | – | 8 | – | 1 |
| Holy Cross | | – | | – | | 2 | – | 8 | – | 0 |
| Northeast Louisiana | | – | | – | | 2 | – | 9 | – | 0 |
North Texas State (originally 9–2) awarded a forfeit win after Mississippi State was found to be using an ineligible player.; Rankings from AP Poll

The 1977 Southern Miss Golden Eagles football team was an American football team that represented the University of Southern Mississippi as an independent during the 1977 NCAA Division I football season. In their third year under head coach Bobby Collins, the team compiled a 6–6 record.

== Schedule ==
| Date | Opponent | Site | Result | Attendance | Source |
|---|---|---|---|---|---|
| September 3 | vs. Troy State | Cramton Bowl; Montgomery, AL | W 42–19 | 12,550 | |
| September 10 | Florida State | M. M. Roberts Stadium; Hattiesburg, MS | L 6–35 | 19,376 | |
| September 17 | at Auburn | Jordan–Hare Stadium; Auburn, AL | W 24–13 | 42,000 | |
| September 24 | at Ole Miss | Hemingway Stadium; Oxford, MS | W 27–19 | 20,000 | |
| October 1 | at Cincinnati | Nippert Stadium; Cincinnati, OH | L 6–17 | 13,392 | |
| October 8 | North Texas State^{†} | M. M. Roberts Stadium; Hattiesburg, MS | L 14–27 | 22,432 | |
| October 15 | at Hawaii | Aloha Stadium; Halawa, HI | W 28–26 | 26,474 | |
| October 22 | at Mississippi State | Scott Field; Starkville, MS | W 14–7 | 36,000 | |
| October 29 | at Memphis State | Liberty Bowl Memorial Stadium; Memphis, TN (rivalry) | L 14–42 | 28,420 | |
| November 5 | at UT Arlington | Cravens Field; Arlington, TX | W 20–3 | 5,200 | |
| November 12 | Louisiana Tech | M. M. Roberts Stadium; Hattiesburg, MS (rivalry) | L 10–28 | 16,431 | |
| November 19 | Arkansas State | M. M. Roberts Stadium; Hattiesburg, MS | L 10–14 | 9,216 | |
^{†}Homecoming
