= 1977 Louisiana Tech Bulldogs football team =

American college football season

1977 Louisiana Tech Bulldogs football

Southland champion Independence Bowl champion

Independence Bowl, W 24–14 vs. Louisville
- Conference: Southland Conference
- Record: 9–1–2 (4–0–1 Southland)
- Head coach: Maxie Lambright (11th season)
- Captains: Larry Anderson; Rod Foppe; John Henry White
- Home stadium: Joe Aillet Stadium

1977 Southland Conference football standings
	Conf.					Overall
Team	W		L		T	W		L		T
Louisiana Tech $	4	–	0	–	1	9	–	1	–	2
Southwestern Louisiana	2	–	1	–	2	6	–	4	–	2
UT Arlington	3	–	2	–	0	5	–	6	–	0
Arkansas State	2	–	3	–	0	7	–	4	–	0
McNeese State	1	–	3	–	1	5	–	5	–	1
Lamar	1	–	4	–	0	2	–	9	–	0
$ – Conference champion

The 1977 Louisiana Tech Bulldogs football team was an American football team that represented Louisiana Tech University as a member of the Southland Conference during the 1977 NCAA Division I football season. In their eleventh year under head coach Maxie Lambright, the team compiled a 9–1–2 record and as both Southland Conference and Independence Bowl champions.

== Schedule ==
Date	Opponent	Site	Result	Attendance	Source
September 10	Sacramento State*	State Fair Stadium; Shreveport, LA	W 56–0	14,746	
September 24	at Illinois State*	Hancock Stadium; Normal, IL	T 21–21	7,500	
October 1	at McNeese State	Cowboy Stadium; Lake Charles, LA	W 14–7	23,571	
October 8	Southwestern Louisiana	Joe Aillet Stadium; Ruston, LA (rivalry)	T 21–21	21,000	
October 15	at Arkansas State	Indian Stadium; Jonesboro, AR	W 20–7	15,128	
October 22	vs. Northwestern State*	State Fair Stadium; Shreveport, LA (rivalry)	W 30–8	32,000	
October 29	UT Arlington	Joe Aillet Stadium; Ruston, LA	W 34–12	16,200	
November 5	at Lamar	Cardinal Stadium; Beaumont, TX	W 23–6	7,129	
November 12	at Southern Miss*	M. M. Roberts Stadium; Hattiesburg, MS (Rivalry in Dixie)	W 28–10	16,431	
November 19	North Texas State*	Joe Aillet Stadium; Ruston, LA	L 14–41	15,300	
November 26	Northeast Louisiana*	Joe Aillet Stadium; Ruston, LA (rivalry)	W 20–0	9,600	
December 17	vs. Louisville*	State Fair Stadium; Shreveport, LA (Independence Bowl)	W 24–14	22,223	
*Non-conference game
