= 1977 Penn State Nittany Lions football team =

American college football season

1977 Penn State Nittany Lions football

Eastern champion Fiesta Bowl champion

Fiesta Bowl, W 42–30 vs. Arizona State
- Conference: Independent

Ranking
- Coaches: No. 4
- AP: No. 5
- Record: 11–1
- Head coach: Joe Paterno (12th season)
- Offensive scheme: I formation
- Defensive coordinator: Jerry Sandusky (1st season)
- Base defense: 4–3
- Captains: John Dunn; Steve Geise; Ron Hostetler; Randy Sidler
- Home stadium: Beaver Stadium

1977 NCAA Division I independents football records
	Conf.					Overall
Team	W		L		T	W		L		T
No. 1 Notre Dame		–		–		11	–	1	–	0
No. 5 Penn State		–		–		11	–	1	–	0
Colgate		–		–		10	–	1	–	0
North Texas State *		–		–		10	–	1	–	0
No. 16 San Diego State		–		–		10	–	1	–	0
Tennessee State		–		–		8	–	1	–	1
No. 14 Florida State		–		–		10	–	2	–	0
No. 8 Pittsburgh		–		–		9	–	2	–	1
East Carolina		–		–		8	–	3	–	0
Rutgers		–		–		8	–	3	–	0
Army		–		–		7	–	4	–	0
Louisville		–		–		7	–	4	–	1
Boston College		–		–		6	–	5	–	0
Cincinnati		–		–		5	–	4	–	2
Georgia Tech		–		–		6	–	5	–	0
Memphis State		–		–		6	–	5	–	0
Northwestern State		–		–		6	–	5	–	0
Syracuse		–		–		6	–	5	–	0
William & Mary		–		–		6	–	5	–	0
Southern Miss		–		–		6	–	5	–	0
Temple		–		–		5	–	5	–	1
Hawaii		–		–		5	–	6	–	0
Navy		–		–		5	–	6	–	0
West Virginia		–		–		5	–	6	–	0
South Carolina		–		–		5	–	7	–	0
Utah State		–		–		4	–	7	–	0
Villanova		–		–		4	–	7	–	0
Illinois State		–		–		3	–	7	–	1
Virginia Tech		–		–		3	–	7	–	1
Miami (FL)		–		–		3	–	8	–	0
Richmond		–		–		3	–	8	–	0
Tulane		–		–		3	–	8	–	0
Air Force		–		–		2	–	8	–	1
Holy Cross		–		–		2	–	8	–	0
Northeast Louisiana		–		–		2	–	9	–	0
North Texas State (originally 9–2) awarded a forfeit win after Mississippi State was found to be using an ineligible player.; Rankings from AP Poll

The 1977 Penn State Nittany Lions football team represented Pennsylvania State University as an independent during the 1977 NCAA Division I football season. Led by 12th-year head coach Joe Paterno, the Nittany Lions compiled a record of 11–1 with a win over Arizona State in the Fiesta Bowl. Penn State played home games at Beaver Stadium in University Park, Pennsylvania.

== Schedule ==
Date	Opponent	Rank	Site	TV	Result	Attendance	Source
September 2	at Rutgers	No. 13	Giants Stadium; East Rutherford, NJ		W 45–7	64,790	
September 17	No. 9 Houston	No. 10	Beaver Stadium; University Park, PA		W 31–14	61,704–62,554	
September 24	Maryland	No. 5	Beaver Stadium; University Park, PA (rivalry)	ABC	W 27–9	62,079	
October 1	Kentucky	No. 4	Beaver Stadium; University Park, PA		L 20–24	62,196	
October 8	Utah State^{†}	No. 10	Beaver Stadium; University Park, PA		W 16–7	62,015	
October 15	at Syracuse	No. 10	Archbold Stadium; Syracuse, NY (rivalry)		W 31–24	27,029	
October 22	West Virginia	No. 10	Beaver Stadium; University Park, PA (rivalry)		W 49–28	62,108	
October 29	Miami (FL)	No. 9	Beaver Stadium; University Park, PA		W 49–7	61,853	
November 5	at NC State	No. 9	Carter–Finley Stadium; Raleigh, NC		W 21–17	44,800	
November 12	Temple	No. 9	Beaver Stadium; University Park, PA		W 44–7	61,327	
November 26	at No. 10 Pittsburgh	No. 9	Pitt Stadium; Pittsburgh, PA (rivalry)	ABC	W 15–13	56,500	
December 25	vs. No. 15 Arizona State	No. 8	Sun Devil Stadium; Tempe, AZ (Fiesta Bowl)	CBS	W 42–30	57,766	
^{†}Homecoming; Rankings from AP Poll released prior to the game

== Game summaries ==
=== Miami (FL) ===
Team	1	2	3	4	Total
Miami (FL)	0	0	0	7	7
• Penn St	7	28	14	0	49

- Date: October 29
- Location: Beaver Stadium • University Park, Pennsylvania
- Game attendance: 61,853

Scoring summary
1	PSU	Guthrie 56-yard pass from Fusina (Bahr kick)	Penn St 7-0
2	PSU	Suhey 1-yard run (Bahr kick)	Penn St 14-0
2	PSU	Torrey 3-yard run (Bahr kick)	Penn St 21-0
2	PSU	Suhey 3-yard run (Bahr kick)	Penn St 28-0
2	PSU	Suhey 1-yard run (Bahr kick)	Penn St 35-0
3	PSU	Fitzkee 72-yard pass from Fusina (Bahr kick)	Penn St 42-0
3	PSU	LaPointe 17-yard pass from Capozzolli (Bahr kick)	Penn St 49-0
4	MIA	Hobbs 3-yard pass from McMillian (Dennis kick)	Penn St 49-7

=== Fiesta Bowl ===
Fiesta Bowl
#15 Arizona State vs. #8 Penn State

Team	1	2	3	4	Total
Arizona St	0	14	0	16	30
• Penn St	14	3	7	18	42

- Date: December 25
- Location: Sun Devil Stadium • Tempe, AZ
- Game attendance: 57,727
- Television network: CBS

Scoring summary
1	PSU	Lally 21-yard blocked punt return (Bahr kick)	Penn St 7-0
1	PSU	Torrey 3-yard pass from Fusina (Bahr kick)	Penn St 14-0
2	ASU	Lane 11-yard pass from Sproul (Hicks kick)	Penn St 14-7
2	PSU	Bahr 23-yard field goal	Penn St 17-7
2	ASU	Washington 13-yard pass from Sproul (Hicks kick)	Penn St 17-14
3	PSU	Geise 18-yard run (Bahr kick)	Penn St 24-14
4	PSU	Suhey 3-yard run (Bahr kick)	Penn St 31-14
4	ASU	Washington 30-yard pass from Sproul (Hicks kick)	Penn St 31-21
4	PSU	Bahr 32-yard field goal	Penn St 34-21
4	ASU	Perry 1-yard run (Hicks kick)	Penn St 34-28
4	PSU	Suhey 2-yard run (Geise run)	Penn St 42-28
4	ASU	Safety, Fitzkee runs out of end zone	Penn St 42-30

== Roster ==
1977 Penn State Nittany Lions football team roster
Players
Coaches
Offense

Pos.	#	Name	Class
WR	81	Bob Bassett	Jr
WR	44	Jimmy Cefalo	Sr
C	55	Chuck Correal	Jr
OT	68	Eric Cunningham	Jr
WR	19	Tom Donovan	So
OT	71	Keith Dorney	Jr
OT	77	Bill Dugan	Fr
G	62	John Dunn	Jr
WR	46	Scott Fitzkee	Jr
QB	14	Chuck Fusina	Jr
RB	24	Mike Guman	So
TE	90	Ron LaPointe	So
RB	48	Booker Moore	Fr
OT	50	Jack Poll	Jr
TE	82	Mickey Shuler	Sr
RB	32	Matt Suhey	So
FB	39	Bob Torrey	Jr
WR	13	Kip Vernaglia	So
G	64	John Wojtowicz	Fr

Defense

Pos.	#	Name	Class
DB	25	Tom Bradley	Jr
DE	54	Bruce Clark	So
DE	94	Cliff Corbin	Sr
LB	95	Tom DePaso	Sr
LB	92	Rick Donaldson	So
S	27	Pete Harris	So
DE	74	Larry Kubin	Fr
DT	57	Pete Kugler	Fr
LB	56	Lance Mehl	So
DT	60	Matt Millen	So
DE	28	Rich Milot	Jr
DB	12	Doug Pysher	Jr
DT	78	Randy Sidler	Sr
LB	65	Paul Suhey	Jr

Special teams

Pos.	#	Name	Class
K	10	Matt Bahr	Jr

Head coach

- Joe Paterno

Coordinators/assistant coaches

- Dick Anderson
- Booker Brooks
- Gregg Ducatte
- Fran Ganter
- Bob Phillips
- John Rosenberg
- Jerry Sandusky
- J. T. White

Legend

- (C) Team captain
- (S) Suspended
- (I) Ineligible
- Injured
- Redshirt

Roster

== NFL draft ==
Seven Nittany Lions were drafted in the 1978 NFL draft.

Round	Pick	Overall	Name	Position	Team
3rd	5	61	Mickey Shuler	Tight end	New York Jets
3rd	25	81	Jimmy Cefalo	Wide receiver	Miami Dolphins
5th	4	113	Randy Sidler	Defensive tackle	New York Jets
6th	17	155	Steve Geise	Running back	Cincinnati Bengals
9th	5	227	Neil Hutton	Running back/Defensive back	New York Jets
10th	17	267	Tom DePaso	Linebacker	Cincinnati Bengals
11th	25	303	Ron Hostetler	Linebacker/Defensive back	Los Angeles Rams
