= 1977 Villanova Wildcats football team =

American college football season

1977 Villanova Wildcats football
- Conference: Independent
- Record: 4–7
- Head coach: Dick Bedesem (3rd season)
- Captains: Sean Collins; Phillip DiGiacomo; Thomas Walsh
- Home stadium: Villanova Stadium

1977 NCAA Division I independents football records
	Conf.					Overall
Team	W		L		T	W		L		T
No. 1 Notre Dame		–		–		11	–	1	–	0
No. 5 Penn State		–		–		11	–	1	–	0
Colgate		–		–		10	–	1	–	0
North Texas State *		–		–		10	–	1	–	0
No. 16 San Diego State		–		–		10	–	1	–	0
Tennessee State		–		–		8	–	1	–	1
No. 14 Florida State		–		–		10	–	2	–	0
No. 8 Pittsburgh		–		–		9	–	2	–	1
East Carolina		–		–		8	–	3	–	0
Rutgers		–		–		8	–	3	–	0
Army		–		–		7	–	4	–	0
Louisville		–		–		7	–	4	–	1
Boston College		–		–		6	–	5	–	0
Cincinnati		–		–		5	–	4	–	2
Georgia Tech		–		–		6	–	5	–	0
Memphis State		–		–		6	–	5	–	0
Northwestern State		–		–		6	–	5	–	0
Syracuse		–		–		6	–	5	–	0
William & Mary		–		–		6	–	5	–	0
Southern Miss		–		–		6	–	5	–	0
Temple		–		–		5	–	5	–	1
Hawaii		–		–		5	–	6	–	0
Navy		–		–		5	–	6	–	0
West Virginia		–		–		5	–	6	–	0
South Carolina		–		–		5	–	7	–	0
Utah State		–		–		4	–	7	–	0
Villanova		–		–		4	–	7	–	0
Illinois State		–		–		3	–	7	–	1
Virginia Tech		–		–		3	–	7	–	1
Miami (FL)		–		–		3	–	8	–	0
Richmond		–		–		3	–	8	–	0
Tulane		–		–		3	–	8	–	0
Air Force		–		–		2	–	8	–	1
Holy Cross		–		–		2	–	8	–	0
Northeast Louisiana		–		–		2	–	9	–	0
North Texas State (originally 9–2) awarded a forfeit win after Mississippi State was found to be using an ineligible player.; Rankings from AP Poll

The 1977 Villanova Wildcats football team represented Villanova University in the 1977 NCAA Division I football season. It was head coach Dick Bedesem's third season with the team. They played their home games at Villanova Stadium in Villanova, Pennsylvania.

== Schedule ==
Date	Opponent	Site	Result	Attendance	Source
September 10	Youngstown State	Villanova Stadium; Villanova, PA	L 10–13	11,700	
September 17	Ball State	Villanova Stadium; Villanova, PA	W 38–16	9,500	
September 24	Dayton	Villanova Stadium; Villanova, PA	L 17–21	7,500	
October 1	at William & Mary	Cary Field; Williamsburg, VA	L 8–28	12,500	
October 8	at Army	Michie Stadium; West Point, NY	L 32–34	30,000	
October 15	Delaware^{†}	Villanova Stadium; Villanova, PA (rivalry)	W 33–16	13,400	
October 22	at Boston College	Alumni Stadium; Chestnut Hill, MA	L 0–17	26,222	
October 29	at West Virginia	Mountaineer Field; Morgantown, WV	W 41–36	31,175	
November 5	at Maryland	Byrd Stadium; College Park, MD	L 13–19	33,000	
November 12	at Holy Cross	Fitton Field; Worcester, MA	W 24–0	7,651	
November 19	Temple	Villanova Stadium; Villanova, PA (Mayor's Cup)	L 15–38	10,000	
^{†}Homecoming
