= 1977 Hawaii Rainbow Warriors football team =

American college football season

1977 Hawaii Rainbow Warriors football
- Conference: Independent
- Record: 5–6
- Head coach: Dick Tomey (1st season)
- Defensive coordinator: Bob Burt (1st season)
- Home stadium: Aloha Stadium

1977 NCAA Division I independents football records
	Conf.					Overall
Team	W		L		T	W		L		T
No. 1 Notre Dame		–		–		11	–	1	–	0
No. 5 Penn State		–		–		11	–	1	–	0
Colgate		–		–		10	–	1	–	0
North Texas State *		–		–		10	–	1	–	0
No. 16 San Diego State		–		–		10	–	1	–	0
Tennessee State		–		–		8	–	1	–	1
No. 14 Florida State		–		–		10	–	2	–	0
No. 8 Pittsburgh		–		–		9	–	2	–	1
East Carolina		–		–		8	–	3	–	0
Rutgers		–		–		8	–	3	–	0
Army		–		–		7	–	4	–	0
Louisville		–		–		7	–	4	–	1
Boston College		–		–		6	–	5	–	0
Cincinnati		–		–		5	–	4	–	2
Georgia Tech		–		–		6	–	5	–	0
Memphis State		–		–		6	–	5	–	0
Northwestern State		–		–		6	–	5	–	0
Syracuse		–		–		6	–	5	–	0
William & Mary		–		–		6	–	5	–	0
Southern Miss		–		–		6	–	5	–	0
Temple		–		–		5	–	5	–	1
Hawaii		–		–		5	–	6	–	0
Navy		–		–		5	–	6	–	0
West Virginia		–		–		5	–	6	–	0
South Carolina		–		–		5	–	7	–	0
Utah State		–		–		4	–	7	–	0
Villanova		–		–		4	–	7	–	0
Illinois State		–		–		3	–	7	–	1
Virginia Tech		–		–		3	–	7	–	1
Miami (FL)		–		–		3	–	8	–	0
Richmond		–		–		3	–	8	–	0
Tulane		–		–		3	–	8	–	0
Air Force		–		–		2	–	8	–	1
Holy Cross		–		–		2	–	8	–	0
Northeast Louisiana		–		–		2	–	9	–	0
North Texas State (originally 9–2) awarded a forfeit win after Mississippi State was found to be using an ineligible player.; Rankings from AP Poll

The 1977 Hawaii Rainbow Warriors football team represented the University of Hawaiʻi at Mānoa as an independent during the 1977 NCAA Division I football season. In their first season under head coach Dick Tomey, the Rainbow Warriors compiled a 5–6 record.

== Schedule ==
Date	Opponent	Site	Result	Attendance	Source
September 10	New Mexico	Aloha Stadium; Halawa, HI	L 26–35	26,532	
September 17	Colorado State	Aloha Stadium; Halawa, HI	L 16–20	26,193	
September 24	Idaho	Aloha Stadium; Halawa, HI	W 45–26	25,463	
October 1	Southwestern Louisiana	Aloha Stadium; Halawa, HI	W 20–6	31,762	
October 8	at Pacific (CA)	Pacific Memorial Stadium; Stockton, CA	L 7–37	10,364	
October 15	Southern Miss	Aloha Stadium; Halawa, HI	L 26–28	26,474	
October 22	Portland State^{†}	Aloha Stadium; Halawa, HI	W 21–12	29,949	
November 6	at San Jose State	Spartan Stadium; San Jose, CA (rivalry)	L 14–24	8,145	
November 19	Bowling Green	Aloha Stadium; Halawa, HI	W 41–21	28,034	
November 26	South Carolina	Aloha Stadium; Halawa, HI	W 24–7	30,146	
December 3	Arizona	Aloha Stadium; Halawa, HI	L 10–17	30,994	
^{†}Homecoming
