= 1977 Tulsa Golden Hurricane football team =

American college football season

1977 Tulsa Golden Hurricane football
- Conference: Missouri Valley Conference
- Record: 3–8 (2–3 MVC)
- Head coach: John Cooper (1st season)
- Home stadium: Skelly Stadium

1977 Missouri Valley Conference football standings
	Conf.					Overall
Team	W		L		T	W		L		T
West Texas State $	5	–	1	–	0	6	–	4	–	1
Wichita State	4	–	1	–	0	5	–	6	–	0
New Mexico State	3	–	2	–	0	4	–	7	–	0
Indiana State	2	–	3	–	0	3	–	7	–	0
Tulsa	2	–	3	–	0	3	–	8	–	0
Drake	1	–	5	–	0	2	–	9	–	0
Southern Illinois	0	–	5	–	0	3	–	8	–	0
$ – Conference champion; Tulsa, Indiana State, and Southern Illinois played designated conference games.

The 1977 Tulsa Golden Hurricane football team represented the University of Tulsa in the 1977 NCAA Division I football season. Competing as a member of the Missouri Valley Conference (MVC), the team was led by first-year head coach John Cooper and played its home games at Skelly Stadium. Tulsa compiled an overall record of 3–8 with a conference mark of 2–3, tying for fourth place in the MVC.

== Schedule ==
Date	Opponent	Site	Result	Attendance	Source
September 3	at Southwestern Louisiana*	Cajun Field; Lafayette, LA	L 21–48	24,130	
September 10	Oklahoma State*	Skelly Stadium; Tulsa, OK (rivalry)	L 17–34	39,168	
September 17	Northeast Louisiana*	Skelly Stadium; Tulsa, OK	W 37–35	14,306	
September 24	at No. 16 Arkansas*	Razorback Stadium; Fayetteville, AR	L 3–37	43,524	
October 1	Wichita State^{†}	Skelly Stadium; Tulsa, OK	L 26–38	17,081	
October 8	at Louisville*	Fairgrounds Stadium; Louisville, KY	L 0–33	12,007	
October 22	at Cincinnati (Note: Designated conference game)*	Nippert Stadium; Cincinnati, OH	L 0–28	14,400	
October 29	at San Diego State*	San Diego Stadium; San Diego, CA	L 7–41	28,306	
November 5	at Drake	Drake Stadium; Des Moines, IA	W 33–23	6,370	
November 12	New Mexico State	Skelly Stadium; Tulsa, OK	W 27–24	11,384	
November 19	at West Texas State	Kimbrough Memorial Stadium; Canyon, TX	L 21–57	6,300	
*Non-conference game; ^{†}Homecoming; Rankings from AP Poll released prior to the game

== Coaching staff ==
- John Cooper – head coach
- Mel Foels – assistant coach
- Harvey Jones – assistant coach
- Larry Marmie – defensive coordinator
- Stan McGarvey – offensive backfield, recruiting coordinator
- Tom Ososkie – assistant coach
- Mike Sweatman – assistant coach
- Steve Walters – assistant coach
- John Wittenborn – assistant coach
