= 1977 Southwestern Louisiana Ragin' Cajuns football team =

American college football season

1977 Southwestern Louisiana Ragin' Cajuns football
- Conference: Southland Conference
- Record: 6–4–2 (2–1–2 Southland)
- Head coach: Augie Tammariello (4th season)
- Home stadium: Cajun Field

1977 Southland Conference football standings
	Conf.					Overall
Team	W		L		T	W		L		T
Louisiana Tech $	4	–	0	–	1	9	–	1	–	2
Southwestern Louisiana	2	–	1	–	2	6	–	4	–	2
UT Arlington	3	–	2	–	0	5	–	6	–	0
Arkansas State	2	–	3	–	0	7	–	4	–	0
McNeese State	1	–	3	–	1	5	–	5	–	1
Lamar	1	–	4	–	0	2	–	9	–	0
$ – Conference champion

The 1977 Southwestern Louisiana Ragin' Cajuns football team was an American football team that represented the University of Southwestern Louisiana (now known as the University of Louisiana at Lafayette) in the Southland Conference during the 1977 NCAA Division I football season. In their fourth year under head coach Augie Tammariello, the team compiled a 6–4–2 record.

== Schedule ==
Date	Opponent	Site	Result	Attendance	Source
September 3	Tulsa*	Cajun Field; Lafayette, LA	W 48–21	24,130	
September 10	Fresno State*	Cajun Field; Lafayette, LA	W 34–13	24,600	
September 17	at Lamar	Cardinal Stadium; Beaumont, TX	W 10–6	17,222	
September 24	UT Arlington	Cajun Field; Lafayette, LA	W 30–20	24,950	
October 1	at Hawaii*	Aloha Stadium; Halawa, HI	L 6–20	31,762	
October 8	at Louisiana Tech	Joe Aillet Stadium; Ruston, LA	T 21–21	21,000	
October 15	Southern Illinois*	Cajun Field; Lafayette, LA	W 24–0		
October 22	at Temple*	Veterans Stadium; Philadelphia, PA	L 20–27	4,320	
October 29	at East Carolina*	Ficklen Memorial Stadium; Greenville, NC	W 9–7	16,662	
November 5	at Arkansas State	Indian Stadium; Jonesboro, AR	L 15–17	10,041	
November 12	Northwestern State*	Cajun Field; Lafayette, LA	L 13–20	28,722	
November 25	McNeese State	Cajun Field; Lafayette, LA	T 9–9		
*Non-conference game
