= 1977 North Texas State Mean Green football team =

American college football season

1977 North Texas State Mean Green football
- Conference: Independent

Ranking
- Coaches: No. 16
- Record: 10–1
- Head coach: Hayden Fry (5th season)
- Home stadium: Fouts Field

1977 NCAA Division I independents football records
	Conf.					Overall
Team	W		L		T	W		L		T
No. 1 Notre Dame		–		–		11	–	1	–	0
No. 5 Penn State		–		–		11	–	1	–	0
Colgate		–		–		10	–	1	–	0
North Texas State *		–		–		10	–	1	–	0
No. 16 San Diego State		–		–		10	–	1	–	0
Tennessee State		–		–		8	–	1	–	1
No. 14 Florida State		–		–		10	–	2	–	0
No. 8 Pittsburgh		–		–		9	–	2	–	1
East Carolina		–		–		8	–	3	–	0
Rutgers		–		–		8	–	3	–	0
Army		–		–		7	–	4	–	0
Louisville		–		–		7	–	4	–	1
Boston College		–		–		6	–	5	–	0
Cincinnati		–		–		5	–	4	–	2
Georgia Tech		–		–		6	–	5	–	0
Memphis State		–		–		6	–	5	–	0
Northwestern State		–		–		6	–	5	–	0
Syracuse		–		–		6	–	5	–	0
William & Mary		–		–		6	–	5	–	0
Southern Miss		–		–		6	–	5	–	0
Temple		–		–		5	–	5	–	1
Hawaii		–		–		5	–	6	–	0
Navy		–		–		5	–	6	–	0
West Virginia		–		–		5	–	6	–	0
South Carolina		–		–		5	–	7	–	0
Utah State		–		–		4	–	7	–	0
Villanova		–		–		4	–	7	–	0
Illinois State		–		–		3	–	7	–	1
Virginia Tech		–		–		3	–	7	–	1
Miami (FL)		–		–		3	–	8	–	0
Richmond		–		–		3	–	8	–	0
Tulane		–		–		3	–	8	–	0
Air Force		–		–		2	–	8	–	1
Holy Cross		–		–		2	–	8	–	0
Northeast Louisiana		–		–		2	–	9	–	0
North Texas State (originally 9–2) awarded a forfeit win after Mississippi State was found to be using an ineligible player.; Rankings from AP Poll

The 1977 North Texas State Mean Green football team represented North Texas State University—now known as the University of North Texas—during the 1977 NCAA Division I football season. In its fifth season under head coach Hayden Fry, the team compiled a 10–1 record. The team played its home games at Fouts Field in Denton, Texas.

== Schedule ==
Date	Opponent	Site	Result	Attendance	Source
September 3	at No. 16 Mississippi State	Scott Field; Starkville, MS	W 15–17 (forfeit)	31,000	
September 10	at UTEP	Sun Bowl; El Paso, TX	W 41–10	18,750	
September 17	vs. SMU	Texas Stadium; Irving, TX (rivalry)	W 24–13	26,097	
September 24	West Texas State	Fouts Field; Denton, TX	W 31–20	16,500	
October 1	at Richmond	City Stadium; Richmond, VA	W 47–14	11,000	
October 8	at Southern Miss	M. M. Roberts Stadium; Hattiesburg, MS	W 27–14	22,432	
October 15	vs. UT Arlington	Texas Stadium; Irving, TX	W 15–6	17,300	
October 22	at Memphis State	Liberty Bowl Memorial Stadium; Memphis, TN	W 20–19	30,065	
October 29	at No. 20 Florida State	Doak Campbell Stadium; Tallahassee, FL	L 14–35	40,597	
November 5	New Mexico State^{†}	Fouts Field; Denton, TX	W 45–17	18,500	
November 19	at Louisiana Tech	Joe Aillet Stadium; Ruston, LA	W 41–14	15,300	
^{†}Homecoming; Rankings from AP Poll released prior to the game

== Roster ==
1977 North Texas Mean Green football team roster
Players
Coaches
Offense

Pos.	#	Name	Class
RB		Bernard Jackson	So
RB		Mike Jones	Sr
WR		Tim Loftin	Sr
QB		Ken Washington	Sr

Defense

Pos.	#	Name	Class
DL	65	Walter Chapman	Sr
DB	44	J. T. Smith	Sr
LB		Burks Washington	Jr

Special teams

Pos.	#	Name	Class
K	3	Iseed Khoury	Sr

Head coach

- Hayden Fry

Coordinators/assistant coaches

- Bill Brashier
- Bill Snyder

Legend

- (C) Team captain
- (S) Suspended
- (I) Ineligible
- Injured
- Redshirt
