= 1977 Wichita State Shockers football team =

American college football season

1977 Wichita State Shockers football
- Conference: Missouri Valley Conference
- Record: 5–6 (3–1 MVC)
- Head coach: Jim Wright (4th season)
- Home stadium: Cessna Stadium

1977 Missouri Valley Conference football standings
	Conf.					Overall
Team	W		L		T	W		L		T
West Texas State $	5	–	1	–	0	6	–	4	–	1
Wichita State	4	–	1	–	0	5	–	6	–	0
New Mexico State	3	–	2	–	0	4	–	7	–	0
Indiana State	2	–	3	–	0	3	–	7	–	0
Tulsa	2	–	3	–	0	3	–	8	–	0
Drake	1	–	5	–	0	2	–	9	–	0
Southern Illinois	0	–	5	–	0	3	–	8	–	0
$ – Conference champion; Tulsa, Indiana State, and Southern Illinois played designated conference games.

The 1977 Wichita State Shockers football team was an American football team that represented Wichita State as a member of the Missouri Valley Conference during the 1977 NCAA Division I football season. In their fourth year under head coach Jim Wright, the team compiled a 5–6 record.

== Schedule ==
Date	Opponent	Site	Result	Attendance	Source
September 3	West Texas State	Cessna Stadium; Wichita, KS	W 14–10	21,924	
September 10	at Iowa State*	Cyclone Stadium; Ames, IA	L 9–35	40,000	
September 17	at New Mexico State	Memorial Stadium; Las Cruces, NM	L 12–24	11,406	
September 24	Kansas State*	Cessna Stadium; Wichita, KS	L 14–21	28,724	
October 1	at Tulsa	Skelly Stadium; Tulsa, OK	W 38–26	17,081	
October 15	at New Mexico*	University Stadium; Albuquerque, NM	L 17–22	22,069	
October 22	Drake	Cessna Stadium; Wichita, KS	W 47–17	16,122	
October 29	Long Beach State*	Cessna Stadium; Wichita, KS	W 35–21	11,629	
November 5	at Louisville*	Fairgrounds Stadium; Louisville, KY	L 21–51	12,031	
November 12	at Indiana State	Memorial Stadium; Terre Haute, IN	W 41–14	6,270	
November 19	Memphis State*	Cessna Stadium; Wichita, KS	L 14–28	25,819	
*Non-conference game
