= 1977 Drake Bulldogs football team =

American college football season

1977 Drake Bulldogs football
- Conference: Missouri Valley Conference
- Record: 2–9 (1–5 MVC)
- Head coach: Chuck Shelton (1st season)
- Home stadium: Drake Stadium

1977 Missouri Valley Conference football standings
	Conf.					Overall
Team	W		L		T	W		L		T
West Texas State $	5	–	1	–	0	6	–	4	–	1
Wichita State	4	–	1	–	0	5	–	6	–	0
New Mexico State	3	–	2	–	0	4	–	7	–	0
Indiana State	2	–	3	–	0	3	–	7	–	0
Tulsa	2	–	3	–	0	3	–	8	–	0
Drake	1	–	5	–	0	2	–	9	–	0
Southern Illinois	0	–	5	–	0	3	–	8	–	0
$ – Conference champion; Tulsa, Indiana State, and Southern Illinois played designated conference games.

The 1977 Drake Bulldogs football team represented the Drake University as a member of the Missouri Valley Conference (MVC) during the 1977 NCAA Division I football season. Led by first-year head coach Chuck Shelton, the Bulldogs compiled an overall record of 2–9 with a mark of 1–5 in conference play, placing sixth in the MVC. Drake played home games at Drake Stadium in Des Moines, Iowa.

== Schedule ==
Date	Opponent	Site	Result	Attendance	Source
September 10	Arkansas State*	Drake Stadium; Des Moines, IA	L 29–31	11,100	
September 17	at Temple*	Veterans Stadium; Philadelphia, PA	L 0–42	8,395	
September 24	at New Mexico State	Memorial Stadium; Las Cruces, NM	L 9–35	11,850	
October 1	Long Beach State*	Drake Stadium; Des Moines, IA	L 10–27	6,380	
October 8	Indiana State	Drake Stadium; Des Moines, IA	L 20–23	7,417	
October 15	at West Texas State	Kimbrough Memorial Stadium; Canyon, TX	L 7–31		
October 22	at Wichita State	Cessna Stadium; Wichita, KS	L 17–47	16,122	
October 29	Lamar*	Drake Stadium; Des Moines, IA	W 43–21	7,140	
November 5	Tulsa	Drake Stadium; Des Moines, IA	L 23–33	6,370	
November 12	at Louisville*	Fairgrounds Stadium; Louisville, KY	L 13–18	12,247	
November 19	at Southern Illinois	McAndrew Stadium; Carbondale, IL	W 13–9	4,803	
*Non-conference game
