= 1977 Illinois State Redbirds football team =

American college football season

1977 Illinois State Redbirds football
- Conference: Independent
- Record: 3–7–1
- Head coach: Charlie Cowdrey (1st season)
- Home stadium: Hancock Stadium

1977 NCAA Division I independents football records
	Conf.					Overall
Team	W		L		T	W		L		T
No. 1 Notre Dame		–		–		11	–	1	–	0
No. 5 Penn State		–		–		11	–	1	–	0
Colgate		–		–		10	–	1	–	0
North Texas State *		–		–		10	–	1	–	0
No. 16 San Diego State		–		–		10	–	1	–	0
Tennessee State		–		–		8	–	1	–	1
No. 14 Florida State		–		–		10	–	2	–	0
No. 8 Pittsburgh		–		–		9	–	2	–	1
East Carolina		–		–		8	–	3	–	0
Rutgers		–		–		8	–	3	–	0
Army		–		–		7	–	4	–	0
Louisville		–		–		7	–	4	–	1
Boston College		–		–		6	–	5	–	0
Cincinnati		–		–		5	–	4	–	2
Georgia Tech		–		–		6	–	5	–	0
Memphis State		–		–		6	–	5	–	0
Northwestern State		–		–		6	–	5	–	0
Syracuse		–		–		6	–	5	–	0
William & Mary		–		–		6	–	5	–	0
Southern Miss		–		–		6	–	5	–	0
Temple		–		–		5	–	5	–	1
Hawaii		–		–		5	–	6	–	0
Navy		–		–		5	–	6	–	0
West Virginia		–		–		5	–	6	–	0
South Carolina		–		–		5	–	7	–	0
Utah State		–		–		4	–	7	–	0
Villanova		–		–		4	–	7	–	0
Illinois State		–		–		3	–	7	–	1
Virginia Tech		–		–		3	–	7	–	1
Miami (FL)		–		–		3	–	8	–	0
Richmond		–		–		3	–	8	–	0
Tulane		–		–		3	–	8	–	0
Air Force		–		–		2	–	8	–	1
Holy Cross		–		–		2	–	8	–	0
Northeast Louisiana		–		–		2	–	9	–	0
North Texas State (originally 9–2) awarded a forfeit win after Mississippi State was found to be using an ineligible player.; Rankings from AP Poll

The 1977 Illinois State Redbirds football team represented Illinois State University as an independent during the 1977 NCAA Division I football season. Led by first-year head coach Charlie Cowdrey, the Redbirds compiled a record of 3–7–1.

== Schedule ==
Date	Opponent	Site	Result	Attendance	Source
September 3	Eastern Illinois	Hancock Stadium; Normal, IL (rivalry)	W 20–0	10,000	
September 10	at Kent State	Dix Stadium; Kent, OH	L 14–33	7,796	
September 17	Central Michigan	Hancock Stadium; Normal, IL	L 7–28		
September 24	Louisiana Tech	Hancock Stadium; Normal, IL	T 21–21	7,500	
October 1	Northern Illinois	Hancock Stadium; Normal, IL	W 16–7		
October 8	at Ball State	Ball State Stadium; Muncie, IN	L 16–27	17,477	
October 15	at Chattanooga	Chamberlain Field; Chattanooga, TN	L 28–31		
October 22	at Indiana State	Memorial Stadium; Terre Haute, IN	L 10–20	16,836	
October 29	Western Illinois	Hancock Stadium; Normal, IL	W 17–7	15,500	
November 5	at Southern Illinois	McAndrew Stadium; Carbondale, IL	L 17–23	6,841	
November 12	at Eastern Michigan	Rynearson Stadium; Ypsilanti, MI	L 28–41		
