= 1977 Southern Illinois Salukis football team =

American college football season

1977 Southern Illinois Salukis football
- Conference: Missouri Valley Conference
- Record: 3–8 (0–5 MVC)
- Head coach: Rey Dempsey (2nd season)
- Home stadium: McAndrew Stadium

1977 Missouri Valley Conference football standings
	Conf.					Overall
Team	W		L		T	W		L		T
West Texas State $	5	–	1	–	0	6	–	4	–	1
Wichita State	4	–	1	–	0	5	–	6	–	0
New Mexico State	3	–	2	–	0	4	–	7	–	0
Indiana State	2	–	3	–	0	3	–	7	–	0
Tulsa	2	–	3	–	0	3	–	8	–	0
Drake	1	–	5	–	0	2	–	9	–	0
Southern Illinois	0	–	5	–	0	3	–	8	–	0
$ – Conference champion; Tulsa, Indiana State, and Southern Illinois played designated conference games.

The 1977 Southern Illinois Salukis football team was an American football team that represented Southern Illinois University (now known as Southern Illinois University Carbondale) in the Missouri Valley Conference (MVC) during the 1977 NCAA Division I football season. Under second-year head coach Rey Dempsey, the team compiled a 3–8 record. The team played its home games at McAndrew Stadium in Carbondale, Illinois.

== Schedule ==
Date	Opponent	Site	Result	Attendance	Source
September 3	at New Mexico State	Memorial Stadium; Las Cruces, NM	L 7–29	11,044	
September 10	at Temple*	Franklin Field; Philadelphia, PA	W 24–20	9,087	
September 17	Indiana State	McAndrew Stadium; Carbondale, IL	L 9–14	13,458	
September 24	at Arkansas State (Note: Designated conference game)	Indian Stadium; Jonesboro, AR	L 6–21	10,957	
October 1	Lamar*	McAndrew Stadium; Carbondale, IL	W 9–5	13,723	
October 8	at East Carolina*	Ficklen Memorial Stadium; Greenville, NC	L 0–33	25,251	
October 15	at Southwestern Louisiana*	Cajun Field; Lafayette, LA	L 0–24	23,802	
October 22	at Northern Illinois*	Huskie Stadium; DeKalb, IL	L 0–28	10,262	
November 5	Illinois State*	McAndrew Stadium; Carbondale, IL	W 23–17	6,841	
November 19	Drake	McAndrew Stadium; Carbondale, IL	L 9–13	4,803	
November 26	at West Texas State	Kimbrough Memorial Stadium; Canyon, TX	L 9–28	7,550	
*Non-conference game
