= 1977 NCAA Division I football season =

American college football season

- Total No. of teams: 144
- Preseason AP No. 1: Oklahoma
- Regular season: September 2 – December 3, 1977
- Number of bowls: 13
- Bowl games: December 17, 1977 – January 2, 1978
- Champion(s): Notre Dame (AP, Coaches, FWAA, NFF)
- Heisman: Texas running back Earl Campbell

The 1977 NCAA Division I football season was one in which the top five teams finished with 11–1 records. Notre Dame, which beat top-ranked and undefeated Texas in the Cotton Bowl, became the national champion.

The 1977 season was the last before NCAA's Division I was divided into I-A and I-AA. On the eve of a national playoff for the smaller programs that would be I-AA, the Sugar Bowl in 1977 became the fourth bowl game to sign a contract guaranteeing an appearance by a major conference champion. The result was that meetings between the media poll choices for the top two teams were less likely, unless those teams were in the Big Ten and Pac-8 (which met in the Rose Bowl), or one of the teams was not obligated to play in a particular bowl game.

Besides the Big Ten-Pac-8 matchup in the Rose Bowl, the Southwest champion played in the Cotton, the Big Eight titlist in the Orange, and the SEC champ in the Sugar. Top teams that had their choice of which bowl to play were either independent or in a conference outside the five major powers (such as the ACC or WAC).

During the 20th century, the NCAA had no playoff for major college football teams, which became Division I-A in 1978. The NCAA Football Guide, however, did note an "unofficial national champion" based on the top ranked teams in the final "wire service" (AP and UPI) polls. The "writers' poll" by Associated Press (AP) was the most popular, followed by the "coaches' poll" by United Press International) (UPI). The AP poll consisted of the votes of as many as 64 writers, though not all voted in each poll, and the UPI poll was taken of a 42-member board of coaches.

== Conference and program changes ==
School	1976 Conference	1977 Conference
Chattanooga Moccasins	D-I Independent	SoCon
East Carolina Pirates	SoCon	D-I Independent
Indiana State Sycamores	D-I Independent	Missouri Valley
Marshall Thundering Herd	D-I Independent	SoCon
Southern Illinois Salukis	D-I Independent	Missouri Valley
Western Carolina Catamounts	D-I Independent	SoCon
William & Mary Indians	SoCon	D-I Independent

The Southwestern Athletic Conference and its seven member institutions reclassified from Division II to Division I in 1977.

== September ==
In the preseason poll released on September 5, the AP ranked Oklahoma first, followed by Michigan, Notre Dame, USC, and Ohio State. Sixth was Alabama, and defending champion Pittsburgh (minus Heisman Trophy winner Tony Dorsett, who had moved on to the NFL, and coach Johnny Majors, who had been hired away by Tennessee) was ranked seventh.

September 10: No. 1 Oklahoma opened its season at home against Vanderbilt, 2–9 the year before. Though the Sooners avoided an upset, their narrow 25–23 win didn't impress the pollsters. No. 2 Michigan won 37–9 at Illinois, and No. 3 Notre Dame won 19–9 at No. 7 Pittsburgh. No. 4 USC won 27–10 at Missouri, and No. 5 Ohio State beat visiting Miami (FL) 10–0. No. 6 Alabama beat Mississippi 34–13 at Birmingham. Although the top six teams all won their openers, the next poll shuffled the rankings: No. 1 Michigan, No. 2 USC, No. 3 Notre Dame, No. 4 Alabama, and No. 5 Oklahoma, with Ohio State dropping to sixth.

September 17: No. 1 Michigan beat Duke 21–9 and No. 2 USC won at Oregon State, 17–10. A week after losing to Alabama, Mississippi stunned the nation with a 20–13 defeat of No. 3 Notre Dame on a humid 100 °F (38 °C) day in Jackson. The Irish dropped to eleventh in the next poll. In another upset by an unranked team, No. 4 Alabama lost 31–24 at Nebraska. No. 5 Oklahoma crushed visiting Utah, 62–24. No. 6 Ohio State, which beat Minnesota 38–7, and No. 10 Penn State, which defeated No. 9 Houston 31–14, moved up in the next poll: No. 1 Michigan, No. 2 USC, No. 3 Oklahoma, No. 4 Ohio State, and No. 5 Penn State.

September 24: No. 1 Michigan beat Navy, 14–7, and No. 2 USC beat visiting TCU 51–0. Meanwhile, No. 3 Oklahoma and No. 4 Ohio State met in Columbus. In a close game, the visiting Sooners won 29–28 after a touchdown, an onside kick recovery, and a last-second field goal by Uwe von Schamann; since Michigan had struggled against an unranked opponent, Oklahoma reclaimed first place in the next poll. No. 5 Penn State beat Maryland, 27–9. No. 6 Texas A&M, which won 33–17 at No. 7 Texas Tech, reached the top five: No. 1 Oklahoma, No. 2 USC, No. 3 Michigan, No. 4 Penn State, and No. 5 Texas A&M.

== October ==
October 1: No. 1 Oklahoma beat Kansas 24–9 and No. 2 USC was idle. No. 3 Michigan beat No. 5 Texas A&M 41–3. No. 4 Penn State lost 24–20 to visiting Kentucky, and No. 6 Ohio State won 35–7 at SMU. No. 8 Texas defeated visiting Rice 72–15. USC, which was already ranked first in the Coaches Poll, also took the lead in the next AP Poll: No. 1 USC, No. 2 Oklahoma, No. 3 Michigan, No. 4 Ohio State, and No. 5 Texas.

October 8: This week featured two top-ten matchups, both of which resulted in upsets. In Los Angeles, No. 1 USC was beaten 21–20 by No. 7 Alabama; the Tide intercepted a two-point conversion try by USC in the final minute to seal the upset. Earlier in Dallas, No. 2 Oklahoma and No. 5 Texas met in their annual game, and Texas won 13–6. In Big Ten play, No. 3 Michigan won 24–14 at Michigan State and No. 4 Ohio State beat Purdue 46–0. No. 6 Colorado beat visiting Oklahoma State 29–13 to move into the top five, and the Wolverines returned to the top: No. 1 Michigan, No. 2 Texas, No. 3 Colorado, No. 4 Alabama, and No. 5 Ohio State.

October 15: No. 1 Michigan beat No. 14 Wisconsin 56–0. No. 2 Texas faced off against No. 8 Arkansas; the Southwestern Conference rivals were having strong seasons despite being under new management. Hall of Fame coaches Darrell Royal of Texas and Frank Broyles of Arkansas had both retired after the 1976 season, with Fred Akers and Lou Holtz inheriting their mantles. This week, Akers' Longhorns prevailed 13–9 over Holtz's Razorbacks. Meanwhile, No. 3 Colorado played Kansas to a 17–17 tie. No. 4 Alabama beat Tennessee in Birmingham, 24–10, and No. 5 Ohio State beat Iowa 27–6. No. 6 USC beat Oregon 33–15 to return to the top five in the next poll: No. 1 Michigan, No. 2 Texas, No. 3 Alabama, No. 4 Ohio State, and No. 5 USC.

October 22: No. 1 Michigan was shut out 16–0 at unranked Minnesota, and No. 2 Texas won 30–14 at SMU. No. 3 Alabama beat Louisville 55–6, and No. 4 Ohio State won 35–15 at Northwestern. No. 11 Notre Dame, which had improved dramatically since coach Dan Devine elevated Joe Montana to the starting quarterback spot, wore their green jerseys for the first time in decades and overwhelmed No. 5 USC 49–19. No. 7 Oklahoma beat No. 16 Iowa State 35–16 and returned to the top five. The Longhorns (now the only undefeated team in the nation) became the fourth team to lead the poll: No. 1 Texas, No. 2 Alabama, No. 3 Ohio State, No. 4 Oklahoma, and No. 5 Notre Dame.

October 29: No. 1 Texas beat visiting No. 14 Texas Tech 26–0, and No. 2 Alabama beat Mississippi State 37–7 in Jackson. No. 3 Ohio State beat Wisconsin 42–0, No. 4 Oklahoma won 42–7 at Kansas State, and No. 5 Notre Dame beat Navy 43–10. Other than the Sooners' switch with the Buckeyes, the next poll was stable: No. 1 Texas, No. 2 Alabama, No. 3 Oklahoma, No. 4 Ohio State, and No. 5 Notre Dame.

== November ==
November 5: No. 1 Texas won 35–21 at Houston, and No. 2 Alabama defeated No. 18 LSU 24–3 in Baton Rouge. No. 3 Oklahoma won 61–28 at Oklahoma State, No. 4 Ohio State won 35–0 at Illinois, and No. 5 Notre Dame beat Georgia Tech 69–14. For the first time since the season began, the top five remained unchanged.

November 12: No. 1 Texas beat TCU 44–14 and No. 2 Alabama beat the visiting Miami Hurricanes, 36–0. No. 3 Oklahoma routed Colorado 52–14, No. 4 Ohio State beat Indiana 35–7, and No. 5 Notre Dame won at No. 15 Clemson, 21–17. No. 6 Michigan won 40–7 at Purdue and returned to the top five in the next poll: No. 1 Texas, No. 2 Alabama, No. 3 Oklahoma, No. 4 Ohio State, and No. 5 Michigan.

November 19: No. 1 Texas beat Baylor 29–7, while No. 2 Alabama and No. 3 Oklahoma were idle. As was usually the case during "The Ten Year War," the Big Ten title came down to a meeting between No. 4 Ohio State and No. 5 Michigan. For the second year in a row, the Buckeyes entered the weekend a game ahead of the Wolverines in the conference standings but ended up falling short. Michigan won 14–6 at home and gained the trip to the Rose Bowl. No. 6 Notre Dame beat Air Force 49–0. The next poll featured No. 1 Texas, No. 2 Alabama, No. 3 Oklahoma, No. 4 Michigan, and No. 5 Notre Dame.

November 25–26: The day after Thanksgiving, No. 3 Oklahoma beat No. 11 Nebraska 38–7 to clinch the Big 8 title and an Orange Bowl berth. No. 17 UCLA could have earned a Rose Bowl berth with a win over USC, but the Trojans prevailed 29–27 on a last-second field goal, giving No. 14 Washington the conference title and a trip to Pasadena. On Saturday, No. 1 Texas won 57–28 at No. 12 Texas A&M for an 11–0 record, the SWC title, and a berth in the Cotton Bowl. No. 2 Alabama closed its season in Birmingham, beating Auburn 48–21. Alabama and No. 7 Kentucky both finished undefeated in SEC play, but the Wildcats were ineligible for bowls because of NCAA probation, ensuring that the Crimson Tide would represent the conference in the Sugar Bowl. No. 4 Michigan (10–1) had completed its regular season, and No. 5 Notre Dame was idle until December 3, a 48–10 win at Miami.

In a season of parity, undefeated No. 1 Texas was followed in the final AP Poll by seven teams with identical 10−1 records: No. 2 Oklahoma, No. 3 Alabama, No. 4 Michigan, No. 5 Notre Dame, No. 6 Arkansas, No. 7 Kentucky, and No. 8 Penn State. To make matters worse, the top four teams were all locked into different bowls because of conference tie-ins, meaning that none of them could play each other in a de facto national title game. The eventual matchups were Texas against Notre Dame in the Cotton Bowl, Oklahoma against Arkansas in the Orange, Alabama against No. 9 Ohio State in the Sugar, and Michigan against No. 13 Washington in the Rose Bowl's traditional Big Ten vs. Pac-8 setup. Kentucky was left out due to its probation, and Penn State settled for a Fiesta Bowl matchup against No. 15 Arizona State.

== Rule changes ==
- Offensive linemen will be allowed to charge downfield ahead of a screen pass, provided the pass is caught at or behind the line of scrimmage. Previously, this resulted in a five-yard ineligible receiver downfield penalty.

== Conference standings ==
1977 Atlantic Coast Conference football standings
	Conf.					Overall
Team	W		L		T	W		L		T
No. 17 North Carolina $	5	–	0	–	1	8	–	3	–	1
No. 19 Clemson	4	–	1	–	1	8	–	3	–	1
NC State	4	–	2	–	0	8	–	4	–	0
Maryland	4	–	2	–	0	8	–	4	–	0
Duke	2	–	4	–	0	5	–	6	–	0
Virginia	1	–	5	–	0	1	–	9	–	1
Wake Forest	0	–	6	–	0	1	–	10	–	0
$ – Conference champion; Rankings from AP Poll

1977 Big Eight Conference football standings
	Conf.					Overall
Team	W		L		T	W		L		T
No. 7 Oklahoma $	7	–	0	–	0	10	–	2	–	0
Iowa State	5	–	2	–	0	8	–	4	–	0
No. 12 Nebraska	5	–	2	–	0	9	–	3	–	0
Colorado	3	–	3	–	1	7	–	3	–	1
Missouri	3	–	4	–	0	4	–	7	–	0
Kansas	2	–	4	–	1	4	–	6	–	1
Oklahoma State	2	–	5	–	0	4	–	7	–	0
Kansas State	0	–	7	–	0	2	–	9	–	0
$ – Conference champion; Rankings from AP Poll

1977 Big Sky Conference football standings
	Conf.					Overall
Team	W		L		T	W		L		T
No. T–5 Boise State $	6	–	0	–	0	9	–	2	–	0
No. T–5 Northern Arizona ^	5	–	1	–	0	9	–	3	–	0
Montana State	3	–	3	–	0	6	–	4	–	0
Weber State	2	–	4	–	0	4	–	6	–	0
Idaho State	2	–	4	–	0	3	–	8	–	0
Idaho	2	–	4	–	0	3	–	8	–	0
Montana	1	–	5	–	0	4	–	6	–	0
$ – Conference champion; ^ – NCAA Division II playoff participant; Boise State concluded its regular season after the NCAA Division II playoffs started; runner-up Northern Arizona was awarded playoff bid.; Rankings from NCAA Division II AP Poll

1977 Big Ten Conference football standings
	Conf.					Overall
Team	W		L		T	W		L		T
No. 9 Michigan +	7	–	1	–	0	10	–	2	–	0
No. 11 Ohio State +	7	–	1	–	0	9	–	3	–	0
Michigan State	6	–	1	–	1	7	–	3	–	1
Indiana	4	–	3	–	1	5	–	5	–	1
Minnesota	4	–	4	–	0	7	–	5	–	0
Purdue	3	–	5	–	0	5	–	6	–	0
Iowa	3	–	5	–	0	5	–	6	–	0
Wisconsin	3	–	6	–	0	5	–	6	–	0
Illinois	2	–	6	–	0	3	–	8	–	0
Northwestern	1	–	8	–	0	1	–	10	–	0
+ – Conference co-champions; Rankings from AP Poll

1977 Ivy League football standings
	Conf.					Overall
Team	W		L		T	W		L		T
Yale $	6	–	1	–	0	7	–	2	–	0
Brown	5	–	2	–	0	7	–	2	–	0
Harvard	4	–	3	–	0	4	–	5	–	0
Penn	4	–	3	–	0	5	–	4	–	0
Dartmouth	4	–	3	–	0	6	–	3	–	0
Princeton	3	–	4	–	0	3	–	6	–	0
Cornell	1	–	6	–	0	1	–	8	–	0
Columbia	1	–	6	–	0	2	–	7	–	0
$ – Conference champion

1977 Mid-American Conference football standings
	Conf.					Overall
Team	W		L		T	W		L		T
Miami (OH) $	5	–	0	–	0	10	–	1	–	0
Central Michigan	7	–	1	–	0	10	–	1	–	0
Ball State	5	–	1	–	0	9	–	2	–	0
Bowling Green	4	–	3	–	0	5	–	7	–	0
Eastern Michigan	4	–	3	–	0	8	–	3	–	0
Kent State	5	–	4	–	0	6	–	5	–	0
Western Michigan	3	–	5	–	0	4	–	7	–	0
Northern Illinois	2	–	5	–	0	3	–	8	–	0
Toledo	2	–	7	–	0	2	–	9	–	0
Ohio	0	–	8	–	0	1	–	10	–	0
$ – Conference champion

1977 Missouri Valley Conference football standings
	Conf.					Overall
Team	W		L		T	W		L		T
West Texas State $	5	–	1	–	0	6	–	4	–	1
Wichita State	4	–	1	–	0	5	–	6	–	0
New Mexico State	3	–	2	–	0	4	–	7	–	0
Indiana State	2	–	3	–	0	3	–	7	–	0
Tulsa	2	–	3	–	0	3	–	8	–	0
Drake	1	–	5	–	0	2	–	9	–	0
Southern Illinois	0	–	5	–	0	3	–	8	–	0
$ – Conference champion; Tulsa, Indiana State, and Southern Illinois played designated conference games.

1977 Pacific Coast Athletic Association football standings
	Conf.					Overall
Team	W		L		T	W		L		T
Fresno State $	4	–	0	–	0	9	–	2	–	0
Pacific (CA)	3	–	1	–	0	6	–	5	–	0
San Jose State	2	–	2	–	0	4	–	7	–	0
Long Beach State	1	–	3	–	0	4	–	6	–	0
Cal State Fullerton	0	–	4	–	0	4	–	7	–	0
$ – Conference champion

1977 Pacific-8 Conference football standings
	Conf.					Overall
Team	W		L		T	W		L		T
No. 10 Washington $	6	–	1	–	0	8	–	4	–	0
No. 15 Stanford	5	–	2	–	0	9	–	3	–	0
No. 13 USC	5	–	2	–	0	8	–	4	–	0
California	3	–	4	–	0	7	–	4	–	0
Washington State	3	–	4	–	0	6	–	5	–	0
Oregon	1	–	6	–	0	2	–	9	–	0
Oregon State	0	–	7	–	0	2	–	9	–	0
UCLA †	0	–	2	–	0	0	–	4	–	0
$ – Conference champion; † – UCLA forfeited 7 wins (5 conference wins) due to ineligible players.; Rankings from AP Poll

1977 Southern Conference football standings
	Conf.					Overall
Team	W		L		T	W		L		T
Chattanooga +	4	–	1	–	0	9	–	1	–	1
VMI +	4	–	1	–	0	7	–	4	–	0
The Citadel	3	–	2	–	0	5	–	6	–	0
Furman	3	–	2	–	1	4	–	5	–	2
Western Carolina	2	–	2	–	1	6	–	4	–	1
Appalachian State	1	–	4	–	0	2	–	9	–	0
Marshall	0	–	5	–	0	2	–	9	–	0
Davidson	0	–	0	–	0	4	–	6	–	0
+ – Conference co-champions; VMI's games against William & Mary, East Carolina, and Richmond and Marshall's game against Louisville were designated as conference games and counted in the SoCon standings.

1977 Southeastern Conference football standings
	Conf.					Overall
Team	W		L		T	W		L		T
No. 2 Alabama $	7	–	0	–	0	11	–	1	–	0
No. 6 Kentucky	6	–	0	–	0	10	–	1	–	0
Auburn	5	–	1	–	0	6	–	5	–	0
LSU	4	–	2	–	0	8	–	4	–	0
Florida	3	–	3	–	0	6	–	4	–	1
Georgia	2	–	4	–	0	5	–	6	–	0
Mississippi State	2	–	4	–	0	5	–	6	–	0
Ole Miss	3	–	4	–	0	6	–	5	–	0
Tennessee	1	–	5	–	0	4	–	7	–	0
Vanderbilt	0	–	6	–	0	2	–	9	–	0
$ – Conference champion; Kentucky ineligible for SEC championship due to NCAA probation. Mississippi State later forfeited all 1977 wins due to NCAA violations.; Rankings from AP Poll

1977 Southwest Conference football standings
	Conf.					Overall
Team	W		L		T	W		L		T
No. 4 Texas $	8	–	0	–	0	11	–	1	–	0
No. 3 Arkansas	7	–	1	–	0	11	–	1	–	0
Texas A&M	6	–	2	–	0	8	–	4	–	0
Houston	4	–	4	–	0	6	–	5	–	0
Texas Tech	4	–	4	–	0	7	–	5	–	0
Baylor	3	–	5	–	0	5	–	6	–	0
SMU	3	–	5	–	0	4	–	7	–	0
TCU	1	–	7	–	0	2	–	9	–	0
Rice	0	–	8	–	0	1	–	10	–	0
$ – Conference champion; Rankings from AP Poll

1977 Southland Conference football standings
	Conf.					Overall
Team	W		L		T	W		L		T
Louisiana Tech $	4	–	0	–	1	9	–	1	–	2
Southwestern Louisiana	2	–	1	–	2	6	–	4	–	2
UT Arlington	3	–	2	–	0	5	–	6	–	0
Arkansas State	2	–	3	–	0	7	–	4	–	0
McNeese State	1	–	3	–	1	5	–	5	–	1
Lamar	1	–	4	–	0	2	–	9	–	0
$ – Conference champion

1977 Southwestern Athletic Conference football standings
	Conf.					Overall
Team	W		L		T	W		L		T
Grambling State $	6	–	0	–	0	10	–	1	–	0
Jackson State	5	–	1	–	0	8	–	3	–	0
Texas Southern	3	–	2	–	1	6	–	4	–	1
Mississippi Valley State	2	–	4	–	0	5	–	5	–	0
Alcorn State	2	–	4	–	0	3	–	8	–	0
Southern	1	–	4	–	1	3	–	7	–	1
Prairie View A&M	1	–	5	–	0	3	–	8	–	0
$ – Conference champion; The Conference was a hybrid of Division I and II programs. Mississippi Valley State and Prairie View A&M were classified as Division II. All the others were classified as Division I.

1977 Western Athletic Conference football standings
	Conf.					Overall
Team	W		L		T	W		L		T
No. 20 BYU +	6	–	1	–	0	9	–	2	–	0
No. 18 Arizona State +	6	–	1	–	0	9	–	3	–	0
Colorado State	5	–	2	–	0	9	–	2	–	1
Wyoming	4	–	3	–	0	4	–	6	–	1
Arizona	3	–	4	–	0	5	–	7	–	0
New Mexico	2	–	5	–	0	5	–	7	–	0
Utah	2	–	5	–	0	3	–	8	–	0
UTEP	0	–	7	–	0	1	–	10	–	0
+ – Conference co-champions; Rankings from AP Poll

1977 NCAA Division I independents football records
	Conf.					Overall
Team	W		L		T	W		L		T
No. 1 Notre Dame		–		–		11	–	1	–	0
No. 5 Penn State		–		–		11	–	1	–	0
Colgate		–		–		10	–	1	–	0
North Texas State *		–		–		10	–	1	–	0
No. 16 San Diego State		–		–		10	–	1	–	0
Tennessee State		–		–		8	–	1	–	1
No. 14 Florida State		–		–		10	–	2	–	0
No. 8 Pittsburgh		–		–		9	–	2	–	1
East Carolina		–		–		8	–	3	–	0
Rutgers		–		–		8	–	3	–	0
Army		–		–		7	–	4	–	0
Louisville		–		–		7	–	4	–	1
Boston College		–		–		6	–	5	–	0
Cincinnati		–		–		5	–	4	–	2
Georgia Tech		–		–		6	–	5	–	0
Memphis State		–		–		6	–	5	–	0
Northwestern State		–		–		6	–	5	–	0
Syracuse		–		–		6	–	5	–	0
William & Mary		–		–		6	–	5	–	0
Southern Miss		–		–		6	–	5	–	0
Temple		–		–		5	–	5	–	1
Hawaii		–		–		5	–	6	–	0
Navy		–		–		5	–	6	–	0
West Virginia		–		–		5	–	6	–	0
South Carolina		–		–		5	–	7	–	0
Utah State		–		–		4	–	7	–	0
Villanova		–		–		4	–	7	–	0
Illinois State		–		–		3	–	7	–	1
Virginia Tech		–		–		3	–	7	–	1
Miami (FL)		–		–		3	–	8	–	0
Richmond		–		–		3	–	8	–	0
Tulane		–		–		3	–	8	–	0
Air Force		–		–		2	–	8	–	1
Holy Cross		–		–		2	–	8	–	0
Northeast Louisiana		–		–		2	–	9	–	0
North Texas State (originally 9–2) awarded a forfeit win after Mississippi State was found to be using an ineligible player.; Rankings from AP Poll

== No. 1 and No. 2 progress ==
WEEKS	No. 1	No. 2	Event
PRE	Oklahoma	Michigan	Michigan 37, Illinois 9 (Sept 10)
1-2	Michigan	USC	Oklahoma 29, Ohio State 28 (Sept 24)
3	Oklahoma	USC	
4	USC	Oklahoma	Alabama 21, USC 20 (Oct 8)
5-6	Michigan	Texas	Minnesota 16, Michigan 0 (Oct 22)
7-11	Texas	Alabama	Oklahoma 38, Nebraska 7 (Nov 25)
12-Bowls	Texas	Oklahoma	Notre Dame 38, Texas 10 (Jan 2)
Final	Notre Dame	Alabama	Notre Dame 38, Texas 10 (Jan 2)

== Bowl games ==
=== Major bowls ===
Monday, January 2, 1978

BOWL				
Cotton	No. 5 Notre Dame Fighting Irish	38	No. 1 Texas Longhorns	10
Sugar	No. 3 Alabama Crimson Tide	35	No. 9 Ohio State Buckeyes	6
Rose	No. 13 Washington Huskies	27	No. 4 Michigan Wolverines	20
Orange	No. 6 Arkansas Razorbacks	31	No. 2 Oklahoma Sooners	6

Two former NFL head coaching failures became college football successes, upsetting the No. 1 and No. 2 teams. Dan Devine had been unspectacular at Green Bay before succeeding Ara Parseghian at Notre Dame in 1975, while Lou Holtz had coached the New York Jets to a 3–11 finish in 1976 before taking over at Arkansas.

The Sugar Bowl was a matchup of coaching legends Bear Bryant and Woody Hayes; Bryant's No. 3 Alabama squad easily handled No. 8 Ohio State, 35–6.

The largest crowd in Cotton Bowl history (76,701) turned out in Dallas to watch the unbeaten No. 1 Texas Longhorns attempt to finalize a national championship. Notre Dame's defense forced five turnovers, which set up five scores. Running back Vagas Ferguson scored three touchdowns, including one on a pass from Joe Montana in a 38–10 win. For Texas, both Earl Campbell and Johnny Lam Jones were injured. Devine changed his mind about resigning his Irish coaching job.

Following Texas' loss in the Cotton Bowl, No. 4 Michigan hoped an impressive win over Washington might vault them to a possible national championship. However, the Huskies, led by Rose Bowl MVP Warren Moon, raced to a 24–0 lead in the third quarter and held on for a 27–20 upset.

With No. 1 Texas and No. 4 Michigan out of the way, No. 2 Oklahoma was in a position to claim the championship with a win over No. 6 Arkansas in the nightcap in Miami. The Razorbacks had finished behind Texas in SWC play and had settled for the Orange Bowl. The week of the game, Holtz suspended the Hogs' top rusher, Ben Cowins, and the top receiver, Donny Bobo for violating team rules. The Sooners were 18-point favorites but Cowins' backup Roland Sales rushed for two touchdowns and over 200 yards as the Razorbacks shut down the Sooners' ground game en route to a 24–0 lead after three quarters and a massive 31–6 upset.

The national championship was disputed as there were six teams with one loss: Alabama, Arkansas, Notre Dame, Texas, Penn State, and Kentucky (prohibited from playing in a bowl due to NCAA probation). Notre Dame had lost to Mississippi, who lost to Alabama, who lost to Nebraska, who lost to Oklahoma, who lost to Arkansas, who lost to Texas who lost to Notre Dame. Penn State lost to Kentucky and Kentucky lost to Baylor who had lost to Texas, Arkansas, and Nebraska. Amidst this confusion, there were several good choices for a champion; giant killers Notre Dame and Arkansas, and third-ranked Alabama, and Texas. Notre Dame, on the strength of its lopsided win over No. 1 Texas, vaulted over Texas, Oklahoma (who lost in the Orange Bowl), Alabama (who won in the Sugar Bowl), and Michigan (who lost in the Rose Bowl). Alabama fans cried foul as they assumed, as the No. 3 team before the bowls, that if No. 1 Texas and No. 2 Oklahoma lost (which they did), they would rise to No. 1 with a win over Ohio State.

In the final polls, the electors for AP and UPI were expectedly divided, but a majority in each picked Notre Dame. With one AP writer naming all three schools as number one, the writers poll was 37 1/3 for Notre Dame, 19 1/3 for Alabama and 5 1/3 for Arkansas. UPI had 23 for Notre Dame, 13 for Alabama and 2 for Arkansas. Devine, who had followed in the footsteps of both Vince Lombardi and Parseghian, reversed his earlier plans and continued as head coach in 1978.

=== Other bowls ===
Bowl	City	State	Date	Winner	Score	Runner-up
Fiesta	Tempe	Arizona	December 25	No. 8 Penn State	42–30	No. 15 Arizona State
Sun	El Paso	Texas	December 31	Stanford	24–14	LSU
Gator	Jacksonville	Florida	December 30	No. 10 Pittsburgh	34–3	No. 11 Clemson
Tangerine	Orlando	Florida	December 23	No. 19 Florida State	40–17	Texas Tech
Astro-Bluebonnet	Houston	Texas	December 31	No. 20 USC	47–28	No. 17 Texas A&M
Liberty	Memphis	Tennessee	December 19	No. 12 Nebraska	21–17	No. 14 North Carolina
Peach	Atlanta	Georgia	December 31	NC State	24–14	Iowa State
Independence	Shreveport	Louisiana	December 17	Louisiana Tech	24–14	Louisville
Hall of Fame	Birmingham	Alabama	December 22	Maryland	17–7	Minnesota

== Heisman Trophy voting ==
The Heisman Trophy is given to the year's most outstanding player

Player	School	Position	1st	2nd	3rd	Total
Earl Campbell	Texas	RB	371	187	60	1,547
Terry Miller	Oklahoma State	RB	125	159	119	812
Ken MacAfee	Notre Dame	TE	55	54	70	343
Doug Williams	Grambling State	QB	36	52	54	266
Ross Browner	Notre Dame	DE	21	45	60	213
Guy Benjamin	Stanford	QB	14	17	35	111
Matt Cavanaugh	Pittsburgh	QB	6	17	34	86
Rick Leach	Michigan	QB	6	9	23	59
Charles Alexander	LSU	RB	2	13	22	54
Wes Chandler	Florida	WR	4	11	16	50

== See also ==
- 1977 College Football All-America Team
- 1977 NCAA Division II football season
- 1977 NCAA Division III football season
