= McNeese–Northwestern State football rivalry =

American college football rivalry

- McNeese Cowboys Northwestern State Demons
- Sport: Football
- First meeting: October 6, 1951; McNeese, 38–21
- Latest meeting: October 17, 2026; McNeese, 24–21
- Next meeting: 2027
- Trophy: None

Statistics
- Total meetings: 75
- All-time series: McNeese leads, 51–23–1
- Largest victory: McNeese, 50–3 (2025)
- Longest win streak: McNeese, 13 (2005–2017)
- Current win streak: McNeese, 3 (2024–present)

Locations of McNeese and Northwestern State

The McNeese–Northwestern State football rivalry is an American college football rivalry between the McNeese Cowboys and the Northwestern State Demons. Both schools are members of the University of Louisiana System, and compete together as members of the Southland Conference (SLC).

== History ==
The two teams have met 74 times on the football field, with McNeese currently holding a 50–23–1 edge in the all-time series.

== Game results ==
McNeese victories	Northwestern State victories	Tie games

No.	Date	Location	Winner	Score
1	October 6, 1951	Lake Charles, LA	McNeese State	38–21
2	October 4, 1952	Natchitoches, LA	McNeese State	32–13
3	October 3, 1953	Lake Charles, LA	Northwestern State	20–6
4	October 2, 1954	Natchitoches, LA	Northwestern State	32–20
5	October 1, 1955	Lake Charles, LA	McNeese State	14–6
6	September 29, 1956^{A}	Natchitoches, LA	McNeese State	20^{A}–13^{A}
7	September 28, 1957	Natchitoches, LA	Northwestern State	23–20
8	September 27, 1958	Lake Charles, LA	McNeese State	25–8
9	September 19, 1959	Natchitoches, LA	Northwestern State	19–6
10	November 5, 1960	Lake Charles, LA	McNeese State	20–7
11	November 4, 1961	Natchitoches, LA	McNeese State	28–14
12	November 3, 1962	Lake Charles, LA	McNeese State	26–6
13	November 9, 1963	Natchitoches, LA	McNeese State	21–13
14	November 7, 1964	Lake Charles, LA	McNeese State	12–10
15	November 6, 1965	Natchitoches, LA	McNeese State	29–21
16	November 5, 1966	Lake Charles, LA	Northwestern State	14–6
17	November 4, 1967	Natchitoches, LA	McNeese State	21–7
18	November 9, 1968	Lake Charles, LA	Northwestern State	28–12
19	November 8, 1969	Natchitoches, LA	Northwestern State	29–28
20	November 7, 1970	Lake Charles, LA	Northwestern State	14–7
21	November 6, 1971	Natchitoches, LA	Tie	3–3
22	November 4, 1972	Lake Charles, LA	Northwestern State	25–10
23	November 3, 1973	Natchitoches, LA	McNeese State	14–0
24	November 9, 1974	Lake Charles, LA	McNeese State	17–7
25	November 8, 1975	Lake Charles, LA	McNeese State	31–14
26	November 6, 1976	Lake Charles, LA	McNeese State	24–15
27	November 5, 1977	Natchitoches, LA	McNeese State	14–7
28	September 23, 1978	Natchitoches, LA	Northwestern State	10–7
29	November 3, 1979	Lake Charles, LA	McNeese State	44–13
30	September 27, 1980	Lake Charles, LA	Northwestern State	13–10
31	October 10, 1981	Natchitoches, LA	McNeese State	42–21
32	October 9, 1982	Lake Charles, LA	McNeese State	21–11
33	September 3, 1983	Natchitoches, LA	McNeese State	18–13
34	September 1, 1984	Lake Charles, LA	McNeese State	17–14
35	September 14, 1985	Natchitoches, LA	Northwestern State	14–13
36	September 13, 1986	Lake Charles, LA	Northwestern State	9–3
37	September 12, 1987	Natchitoches, LA	Northwestern State	39–3
38	October 8, 1988	Lake Charles, LA	Northwestern State	25–20
39	September 23, 1989	Natchitoches, LA	Northwestern State	18–17

No.	Date	Location	Winner	Score
40	October 13, 1990	Lake Charles, LA	McNeese State	38–21
41	October 19, 1991	Natchitoches, LA	Northwestern State	20–3
42	October 17, 1992	Lake Charles, LA	McNeese State	29–0
43	November 13, 1993	Natchitoches, LA	McNeese State	34–7
44	November 12, 1994	Natchitoches, LA	McNeese State	28–7
45	November 11, 1995	Lake Charles, LA	McNeese State	20–10
46	November 16, 1996	Natchitoches, LA	McNeese State	20–3
47	October 11, 1997	Lake Charles, LA	McNeese State	50–7
48	October 15, 1998	Natchitoches, LA	Northwestern State	14–10
49	October 23, 1999	Lake Charles, LA	McNeese State	20–17
50	October 21, 2000	Natchitoches, LA	Northwestern State	37–34
51	November 10, 2001	Lake Charles, LA	McNeese State	17–10
52	November 16, 2002	Natchitoches, LA	McNeese State	27–3
53	November 15, 2003	Lake Charles, LA	McNeese State	13–9
54	October 16, 2004	Natchitoches, LA	Northwestern State	47–17
55	November 12, 2005	Lake Charles, LA	McNeese State	22–17
56	November 11, 2006	Natchitoches, LA	McNeese State	29–26
57	November 10, 2007	Lake Charles, LA	McNeese State	27–21
58	November 15, 2008	Natchitoches, LA	McNeese State	24–17
59	October 17, 2009	Lake Charles, LA	McNeese State	51–23
60	October 2, 2010	Natchitoches, LA	McNeese State	24–7
61	October 1, 2011	Natchitoches, LA	McNeese State	20–18
62	September 29, 2012	Lake Charles, LA	McNeese State	30–22
63	November 16, 2013	Lake Charles, LA	McNeese State	43–17
64	November 1, 2014	Natchitoches, LA	McNeese State	35–28
65	October 24, 2015	Lake Charles, LA	McNeese	47–27
66	October 22, 2016	Natchitoches, LA	McNeese	48–27
67	November 11, 2017	Lake Charles, LA	McNeese	44–24
68	November 10, 2018	Natchitoches, LA	Northwestern State	37–34 ^{OT}
69	November 2, 2019	Lake Charles, LA	McNeese	30–20
70	March 20, 2021	Natchitoches, LA	McNeese	21–7
71	October 16, 2021	Natchitoches, LA	McNeese	35–17
72	November 20, 2021	Lake Charles, LA	Northwestern State	24–20
73	November 16, 2024	Natchitoches, LA	McNeese	35–3
74	November 1, 2025	Lake Charles, LA	McNeese	50–3
75	October 17, 2026	Natchitoches, LA	McNeese	24–21
Series: McNeese leads 51–23–1
^{A} McNeese initially won the game, but later forfeited the victory. October 28, 2023, game canceled due to Northwestern State canceling remainder of 2023 season.

== See also ==
- List of NCAA college football rivalry games
