= Cravens Field =

Multi-purpose stadium in Arlington, Texas, USA

- Interactive map of Cravens Field
- Address: 1400 West Lamar Boulevard; Arlington, Texas 76012
- Coordinates: 32.7626892°N 97.1238369°W
- Owner: Arlington ISD

Construction
- Built: 1975

Tenants
- UT Arlington Mavericks football (1977–1979); Lamar High School

Cravens Field is a multi-purpose stadium on the campus of Lamar High School in Arlington, Texas. From 1977 through their 1979 season, the UT Arlington college football team utilized Cravens Field as their home stadium. The Mavericks moved their games as a result of construction at Arlington Stadium scheduled when their season was normally played.
