= Navarre Stadium =

Football stadium in Lake Charles, Louisiana, U.S.

- The Hole
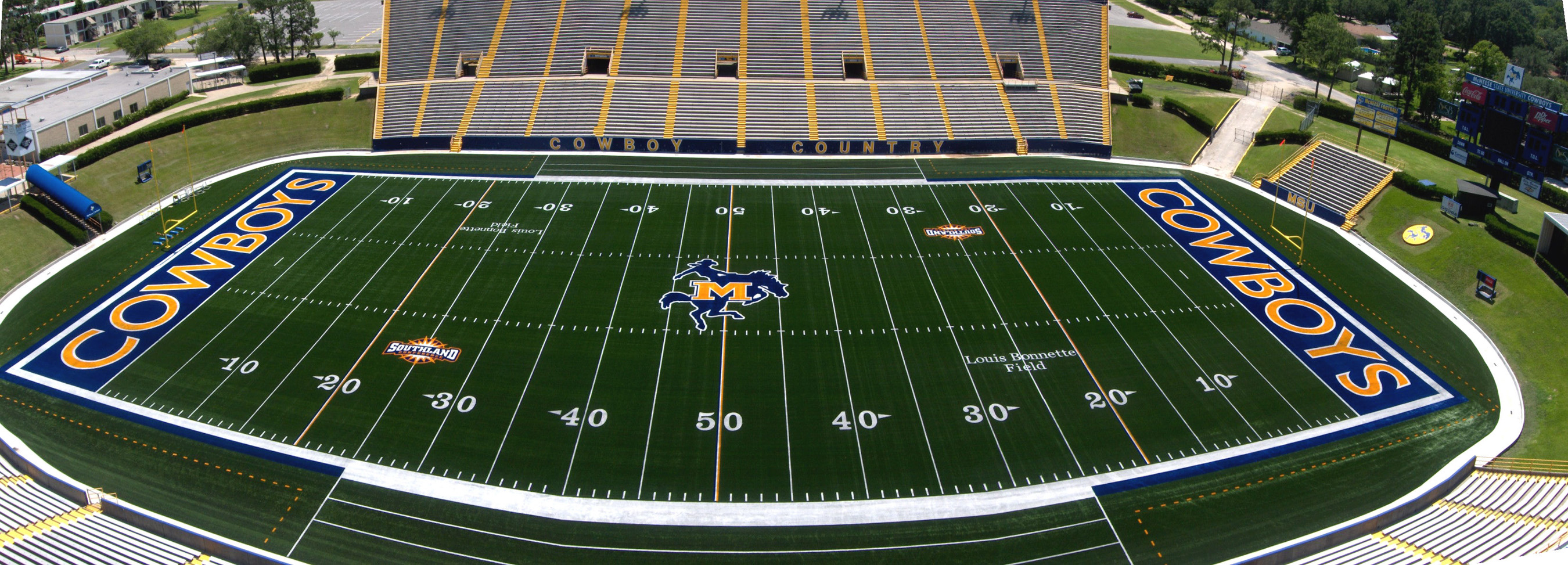
- Louis Bonnette Field
- Interactive map of Navarre Stadium
- Location: 700 E. McNeese Street Lake Charles, Louisiana 70605
- Coordinates: 30°10′24″N 93°12′36″W
- Owner: McNeese State University
- Operator: McNeese State University
- Capacity: 12,226 (1965–1974); 17,000 (1975–1997); 17,410 (1998–2010); 17,610 (2011–present)
- Executive suites: Noland SkyRanch 410 seats
- Surface: Artificial turf (Hellas Matrix)
- Record attendance: 27,500 on Nov. 20, 1976 vs University of Louisiana at Lafayette

Construction
- Opened: 1965

Tenant
- McNeese Cowboys football (1965–present)

Navarre Stadium, formerly Cowboy Stadium, is a 17,610-seat multi-purpose stadium in Lake Charles, Louisiana. It is home to the McNeese Cowboys football team, and is affectionately referred to as "The Hole". It was transformed for the 2008 season to artificial turf. The playing surface is named Louis Bonnette Field, in honor of McNeese's longtime sports information director. Louis' son, Matthew, succeeded him in the post. The playing surface was replaced prior to the 2018 football season with Hellas Matrix turf. The $650,000 new surface as well as drainage improvements were funded by the same donor, Robert Noland, as for the 2008 installation.

== History ==
The Jack V. Doland Fieldhouse officially opened in September 2011. The new state of the art $8.25 million field house (53,838 sq ft) more than doubled the size of the former field house (30,141 sq ft) and included climate-controlled seating and a club room.

Since July 23, 2025, the stadium has been renamed Navarre Stadium after its naming rights, previously held by Bill Doré, a McNeese alumnus, were sold to Ryan Navarre, another alumnus. The agreement is a ten-year deal and valued at $5 million.

== Features ==
The field house includes the following:

- Weight room
- Conference rooms
- Enlarged ticket office
- Enlarged locker room
- Team meeting rooms
- Hall of fame room
- Coaches offices
- Outdoor seating deck
- Indoor club room
- Academic resource center

== Gallery ==
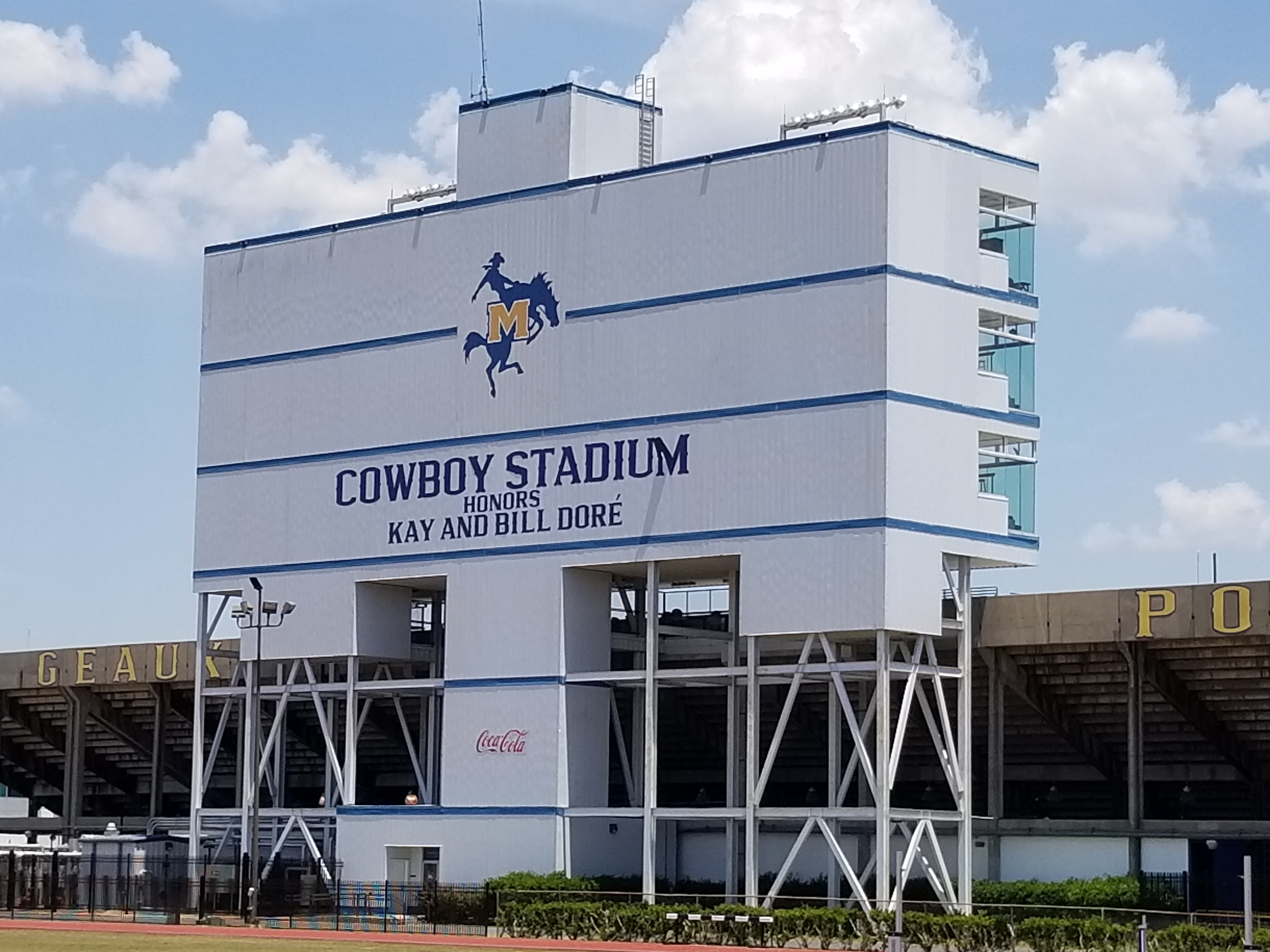
Louis Bonnette Field at Cowboy Stadium exterior

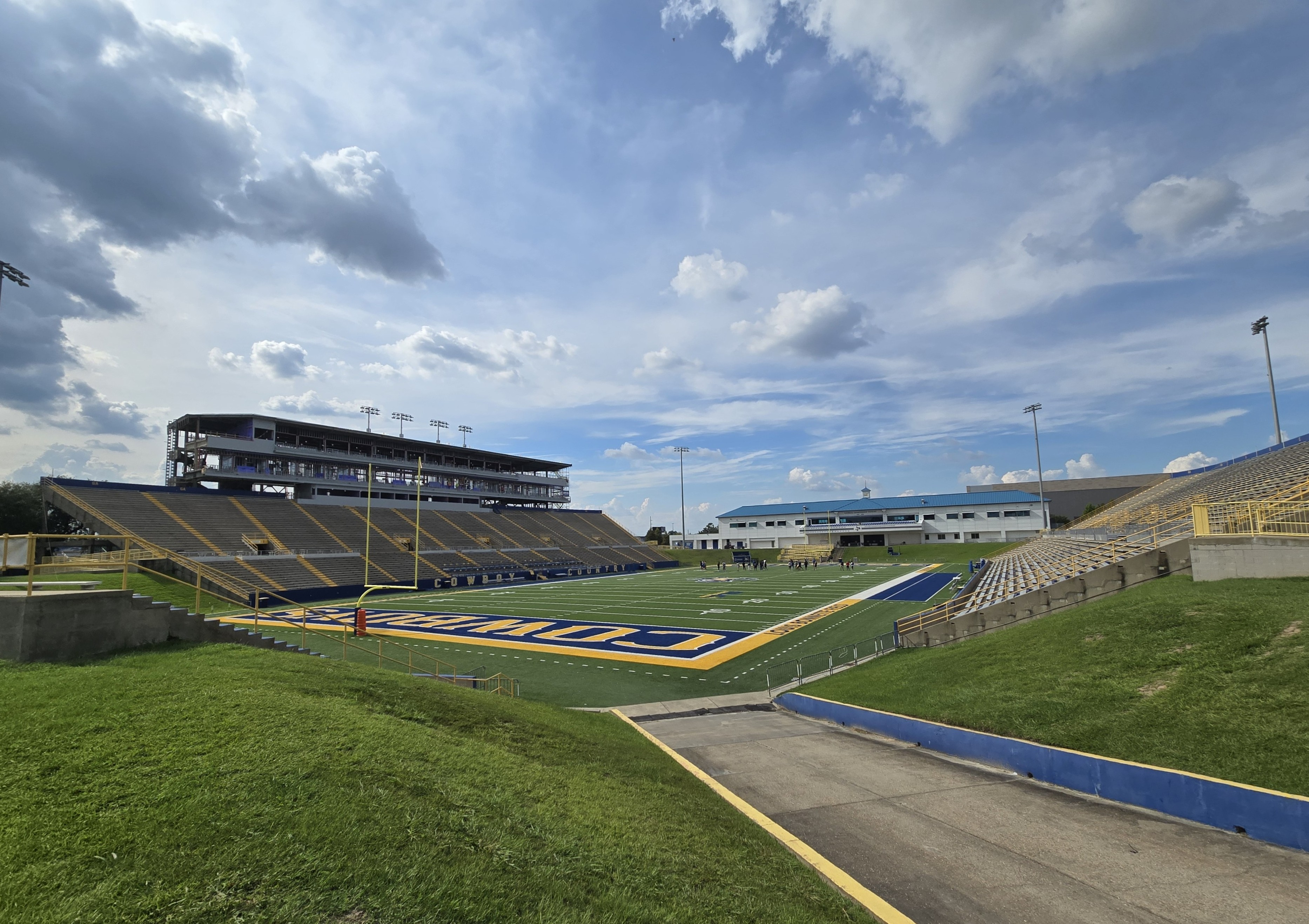
Louis Bonnette Field at Cowboy Stadium

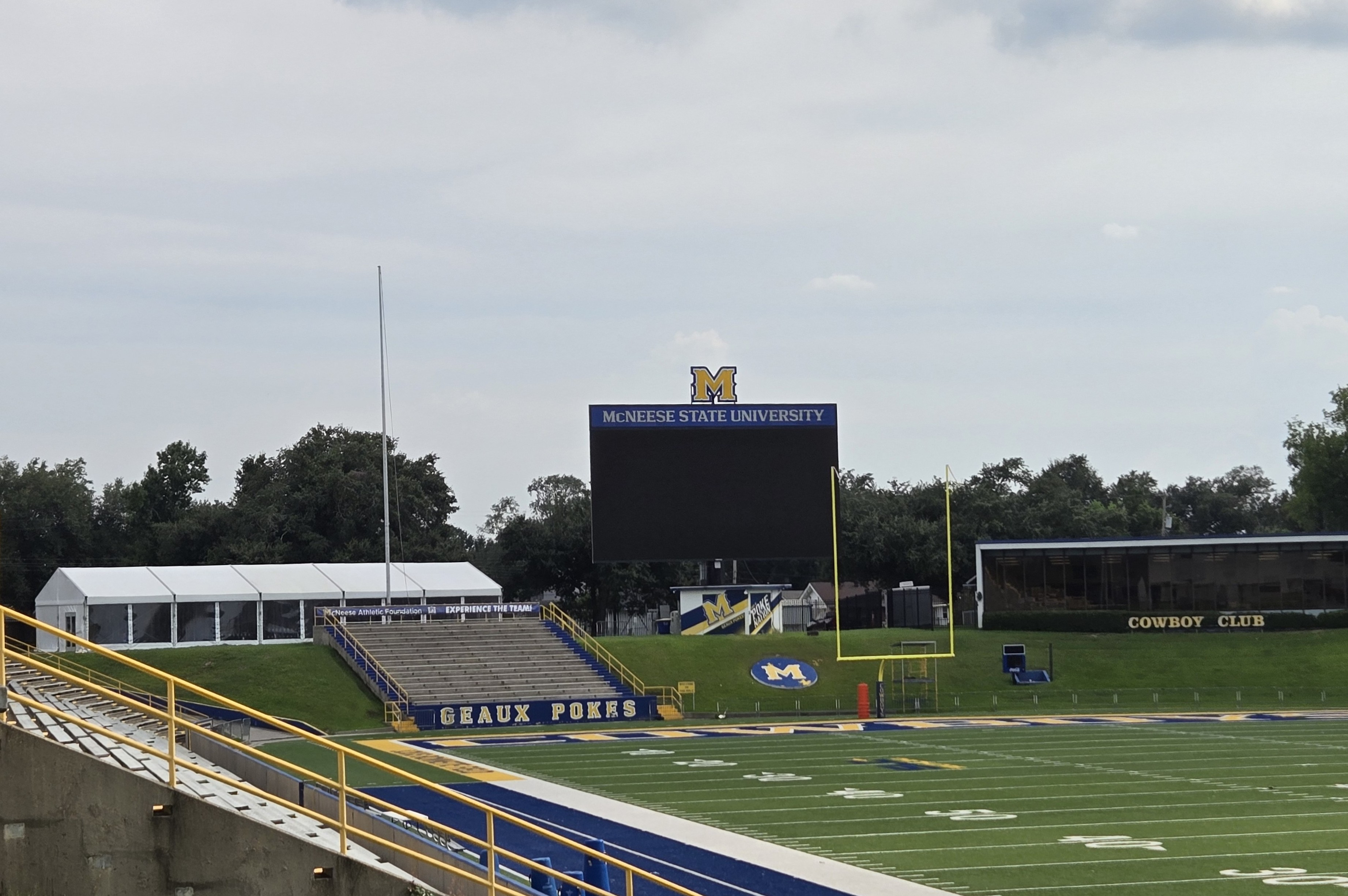
Scoreboard and Cowboy club

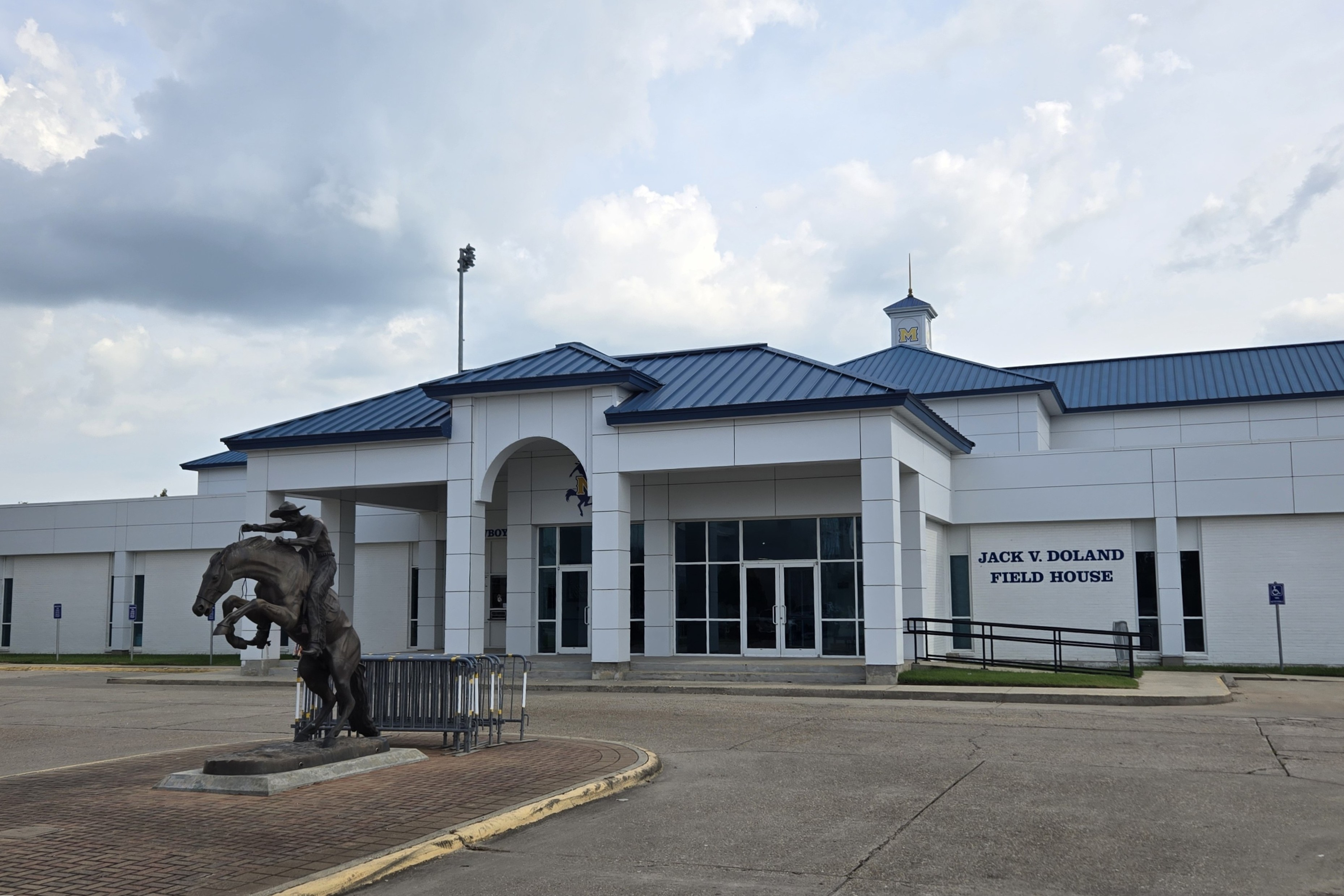
Jack V. Doland Field House

== See also ==
- List of NCAA Division I FCS football stadiums
