= 1977 Lafayette Leopards football team =

American college football season

1977 Lafayette Leopards football
- Conference: Independent
- Record: 5–6
- Head coach: Neil Putnam (7th season)
- Captains: John Orrico; Thomas Padilla
- Home stadium: Fisher Field

1977 NCAA Division II independents football records
	Conf.			Overall
Team	W	L	T	W		L		T
No. 8 Lehigh ^		–		12	–	2	–	0
UNLV		–		9	–	2	–	0
Kentucky State		–		8	–	2	–	1
No. T–5 Nevada		–		8	–	3	–	0
Central Connecticut		–		7	–	3	–	0
Northern Michigan ^		–		7	–	3	–	0
Youngstown State		–		7	–	3	–	0
Portland State		–		7	–	4	–	0
Delaware		–		6	–	3	–	1
Akron		–		6	–	4	–	1
American International		–		5	–	4	–	1
West Chester		–		5	–	5	–	0
Central State (OH)		–		5	–	6	–	0
Arkansas–Pine Bluff		–		4	–	5	–	1
Bucknell		–		4	–	5	–	0
Southern Connecticut State		–		4	–	6	–	0
Northeastern		–		3	–	6	–	1
Northern Colorado		–		3	–	7	–	0
Santa Clara		–		2	–	7	–	1
Eastern Illinois		–		1	–	10	–	0
^ – NCAA Division II playoff participant; Rankings from Associated Press poll

The 1977 Lafayette Leopards football team was an American football team that represented Lafayette College as an independent during the 1977 NCAA Division II football season. In their seventh year under head coach Neil Putnam, the Leopards compiled a 5–6 record. John Orrico and Thomas Padilla were the team captains. Lafayette played its home games at Fisher Field on College Hill in Easton, Pennsylvania.

== Schedule ==
Date	Opponent	Site	Result	Attendance	Source
September 10	Maine	Fisher Field; Easton, PA	L 10–12	4,200–4,328	
September 17	at Colgate	Andy Kerr Stadium; Hamilton, NY	L 12–38	4,200	
September 24	at Columbia	Baker Field; New York, NY	L 10–21	1,500	
October 1	at Merchant Marine	Tomb Field; Kings Point, NY	W 33–6	4,000	
October 8	Bucknell	Fisher Field; Easton, PA	W 34–7	7,500–8,000	
October 14	at Penn	Franklin Field; Philadelphia, PA	L 7–42	3,353	
October 22	at Army	Michie Stadium; West Point, NY	L 6–42	28,277–28,322	
October 29	Gettysburg	Fisher Field; Easton, PA	W 22–3	6,000–6,500	
November 5	Fordham	Fisher Field; Easton, PA	W 41–23	3,500	
November 12	Davidson	Fisher Field; Easton, PA	W 20–18	2,500	
November 19	at No. 8 Lehigh	Taylor Stadium; Bethlehem, PA (The Rivalry)	L 17–35	18,000	
Rankings from AP Poll released prior to the game
