= 1977 Howard Bison football team =

American college football season

1977 Howard Bison football
- Conference: Mid-Eastern Athletic Conference
- Record: 5–5 (2–4 MEAC)
- Head coach: Doug Porter (4th season)
- Home stadium: RFK Stadium; Howard Stadium

1977 Mid-Eastern Athletic Conference football standings
	Conf.					Overall
Team	W		L		T	W		L		T
No. 4 South Carolina State $	6	–	0	–	0	9	–	1	–	1
North Carolina A&T	5	–	1	–	0	7	–	4	–	0
Delaware State	4	–	2	–	0	7	–	4	–	0
Morgan State	3	–	3	–	0	4	–	6	–	1
Howard	2	–	4	–	0	5	–	5	–	0
Maryland Eastern Shore	1	–	5	–	0	3	–	8	–	0
North Carolina Central	0	–	6	–	0	1	–	10	–	0
$ – Conference champion; Rankings from Associated Press poll

The 1977 Howard Bison football team represented Howard University as a member of the Mid-Eastern Athletic Conference (MEAC) during the 1977 NCAA Division II football season. Led by fourth-year head coach Doug Porter, the Bison compiled an overall record of 5–5, with a mark of 2–4 in conference play, and finished fifth in the MEAC.

== Schedule ==
Date	Opponent	Site	Result	Attendance	Source
September 10	vs. Florida A&M*	Giants Stadium; East Rutherford, NJ (Football Scholarship Classic)	L 6–28	34,601–35,094	
September 17	Maryland Eastern Shore	Howard Stadium; Washington, DC	W 15–0	4,000	
September 24	at No. 2 South Carolina State	State College Stadium; Orangeburg, SC	L 16–41	5,820	
October 8	at Delaware State	Alumni Stadium; Dover, DE	L 0–18	1,000	
October 15	Virginia State*	RFK Stadium; Washington, DC	W 33–0	7,500	
October 22	at North Carolina A&T	World War Memorial Stadium; Greensboro, NC	L 10–34	8,000	
October 29	Hampton*	Howard Stadium; Washington, DC (rivalry)	W 20–14	4,500	
November 5	Southern*	RFK Stadium; Washington, DC	W 26–16	6,000	
November 12	at North Carolina Central	O'Kelly Stadium; Durham, NC	W 33–0	4,500	
November 19	at Morgan State	Hughes Stadium; Baltimore, MD (rivalry)	L 24–33	5,100	
*Non-conference game; Rankings from Coaches' Poll released prior to the game
