= Neil Putnam =

American football player and coach (born 1936)

Biographical details
- Born: February 25, 1936 (age 90)

Playing career
- 1957: Miami (OH)

Coaching career (HC unless noted)
- 1962–1964: Dartmouth (assistant)
- 1965–1970: Yale (assistant)
- 1971–1980: Lafayette

Head coaching record
- Overall: 44–55–3

Neil E. Putnam (born February 25, 1936) is an American former football player and coach. He served as the head football coach at Lafayette College from 1971 to 1980, compiling a record of 44–55–3. Putnam is a native of Youngstown, Ohio. He played college football at Miami University.

== Head coaching record ==
=== College ===
Year	Team	Overall	Conference	Standing	Bowl/playoffs
Lafayette Leopards (Middle Three Conference) (1971–1975)
1971	Lafayette	5–5	1–1	2nd	
1972	Lafayette	3–7	0–2	3rd	
1973	Lafayette	6–3–1	0–2	3rd	
1974	Lafayette	3–7	0–2	3rd	
1975	Lafayette	5–5	0–2	3rd	
Lafayette Leopards (NCAA Division II independent) (1976–1977)
1976	Lafayette	5–5			
1977	Lafayette	5–6			
Lafayette Leopards (NCAA Division I-AA independent) (1978–1980)
1978	Lafayette	4–7			
1979	Lafayette	5–3–2			
1980	Lafayette	3–7			
Lafayette:		44–55–3	1–9		
Total:		44–55–3			
