= Beanie Cooper =

American football coach and athletics administrator

Biographical details
- Born: March 1, 1928; Sioux City, Iowa, U.S.
- Died: April 20, 2014 (aged 86); Sioux City, Iowa, U.S.

Coaching career (HC unless noted)
- 1958–1967: Bishop Garrigan HS (IA)
- 1969–1974: Bishop Heelan Catholic HS (IA)
- 1975–1978: South Dakota

Administrative career (AD unless noted)
- 1958–1968: Bishop Garrigan HS (IA)
- 1971–1975: Bishop Heelan Catholic HS (IA)
- 1976–1981: South Dakota
- 1981–1989: Indiana State

Head coaching record
- Overall: 18–24–1 (college)

Accomplishments and honors

Championships
- 1 NCC (1978)

Bernard F. "Beanie" Cooper (March 1, 1928 – April 20, 2014) was an American football coach and athletics administrator. He served as the head football coach at the University of South Dakota from 1975 to 1978, comping a record of 18–24–1. Cooper was also the athletic director at South Dakota from 1976 to 1981 and Indiana State University from 1981 to 1989.

As a high school football coach at Bishop Garrigan High School in Algona, Iowa and Bishop Heelan Catholic High School in Sioux City, Iowa, Cooper was inducted into the Iowa High School Football Hall of Fame.

== Head coaching record ==
=== College ===
Year	Team	Overall	Conference	Standing	Bowl/playoffs
South Dakota Coyotes (North Central Conference) (1975–1978)
1975	South Dakota	3–8	1–6	T–7th	
1976	South Dakota	4–5–1	3–2–1	4th	
1977	South Dakota	4–7	2–4–1	T–6th	
1978	South Dakota	7–4	5–0–1	1st	
South Dakota:		18–24–1	11–12–3		
Total:		18–24–1			
National championship Conference title Conference division title or championship game berth
