= 1977 Delaware State Hornets football team =

American college football season

1977 Delaware State Hornets football

Orange Blossom Classic, L 15–37 vs. Florida A&M
- Conference: Mid-Eastern Athletic Conference
- Record: 7–4 (4–2 MEAC)
- Head coach: Ed Wyche (3rd season)
- Home stadium: Alumni Stadium

1977 Mid-Eastern Athletic Conference football standings
	Conf.					Overall
Team	W		L		T	W		L		T
No. 4 South Carolina State $	6	–	0	–	0	9	–	1	–	1
North Carolina A&T	5	–	1	–	0	7	–	4	–	0
Delaware State	4	–	2	–	0	7	–	4	–	0
Morgan State	3	–	3	–	0	4	–	6	–	1
Howard	2	–	4	–	0	5	–	5	–	0
Maryland Eastern Shore	1	–	5	–	0	3	–	8	–	0
North Carolina Central	0	–	6	–	0	1	–	10	–	0
$ – Conference champion; Rankings from Associated Press poll

The 1977 Delaware State Hornets football team represented Delaware State College—now known as Delaware State University—as a member of the Mid-Eastern Athletic Conference (MEAC) in the 1977 NCAA Division II football season. Led by third-year head coach Ed Wyche, the Hornets compiled an overall record of 7–4 and a mark of 4–2 in conference play, placing third out of seven teams in the MEAC.

The Hornets were invited to the Orange Blossom Classic, where they lost to the black national champion Florida A&M, 37–15.

== Schedule ==
Date	Opponent	Site	Result	Attendance	Source
September 10	at South Carolina State	Bulldog Stadium; Orangeburg, SC	L 0–21	7,343	
September 17	Clarion State*	Alumni Stadium; Dover, DE	L 3–8		
September 24	at Salisbury*	Salisbury, MD	W 18–17	3,100	
October 1	at Maryland Eastern Shore	Princess Anne, MD	W 22–0		
October 8	Howard	Alumni Stadium; Dover, DE	W 18–0	1,000	
October 15	at North Carolina Central	O'Kelly–Riddick Stadium; Durham, NC	W 23–0	11,000	
October 22	Morgan State	Alumni Stadium; Dover, DE	W 20–6		
October 29	Kentucky State*	Alumni Stadium; Dover, DE	W 10–3		
November 5	at Bethune–Cookman*	Daytona Beach, FL	W 10–6		
November 12	North Carolina A&T	Alumni Stadium; Dover, DE	L 7–22	3,600	
December 10	vs. Florida A&M*	Orange Bowl; Miami, FL (Orange Blossom Classic)	L 15–37	29,493	
*Non-conference game
