= 1977 San Francisco State Gators football team =

American college football season

1977 San Francisco State Gators football
- Conference: Far Western Conference
- Record: 5–5 (2–3 FWC)
- Head coach: Vic Rowen (17th season)
- Home stadium: Cox Stadium

1977 Far Western Conference football standings
	Conf.					Overall
Team	W		L		T	W		L		T
No. 3 UC Davis $^	5	–	0	–	0	11	–	1	–	0
Chico State	3	–	1	–	1	6	–	2	–	1
Cal State Hayward	2	–	2	–	1	6	–	3	–	1
San Francisco State	2	–	3	–	0	5	–	5	–	0
Humboldt State	1	–	3	–	1	5	–	4	–	1
Sacramento State	0	–	4	–	1	0	–	10	–	1
$ – Conference champion; ^ – NCAA Division II playoff participant; Rankings from Associated Press poll

The 1977 San Francisco State Gators football team represented San Francisco State University as a member of the Far Western Conference (FWC) during the 1977 NCAA Division II football season. Led by 17th-year head coach Vic Rowen, San Francisco State compiled an overall record of 5–5 with a mark of 2–3 in conference play, placing fourth in the FWC. For the season the team outscored by its opponents 197 to 155. The Gators played home games at Cox Stadium in San Francisco.

== Schedule ==
Date	Opponent	Site	Result	Attendance	Source
September 10	at Cal State Northridge*	Devonshire Downs; Northridge, CA	L 10–17	2,700–5,000	
September 17	Cal Poly Pomona*	Cox Stadium; San Francisco, CA	W 21–18	1,400	
September 24	Southern Oregon*	Cox Stadium; San Francisco, CA	W 41–20	2,100	
October 1	Nevada*	Cox Stadium; San Francisco, CA	L 7–47	3,155	
October 8	at Chico State	University Stadium; Chico, CA	L 0–32	3,856	
October 15	Cal State Hayward	Cox Stadium; San Francisco, CA	W 16–10	1,690	
October 22	at Sacramento State	Hornet Stadium; Sacramento, CA	W 19–7	2,976–3,000	
October 29	Humboldt State	Cox Stadium; San Francisco, CA	L 13–19	2,625	
November 5	at No. 7 UC Davis	Toomey Field; Davis, CA	L 7–21	5,700	
November 12	at Cal State Los Angeles*	Campus Field; Los Angeles, CA	W 21–6	4,000	
*Non-conference game; Rankings from Associated Press Poll released prior to the game
