= 1977 Grantland Rice Bowl =

North Dakota State Bison	Jacksonville State Gamecocks
(9–1–1)	(10–2)
North Central Conference	Gulf South Conference
7	31
Head coach: Jim Wacker	Head coach: Jim Fuller
	1	2	3	4	Total
North Dakota State	0	0	0	7	7
Jacksonville State	10	14	7	0	31
- Date: December 3, 1977
- Season: 1977
- Stadium: Memorial Stadium
- Location: Anniston, Alabama
- Attendance: 10,000

The 1977 Grantland Rice Bowl was an NCAA Division II game following the 1977 season, between the North Dakota State Bison and the Jacksonville State Gamecocks. The game was played in Anniston, Alabama at Memorial Stadium as the Gamecocks' normal venue – Paul Snow Stadium – was being renovated. Jacksonville State defensive tackle Jesse Baker was named most valuable defensive player, and his teammate quarterback Bobby Ray Green was named most valuable offensive player. This was the last playing of the Grantland Rice Bowl, as the NCAA discontinued use of bowl names for the Division II semifinals after 1977.

== Notable participants ==
Jacksonville State defensive tackle Jesse Baker was selected in the 1979 NFL draft. Baker and head coach Jim Fuller are inductees of the university's hall of fame.

North Dakota State running back Gordy Sprattler was selected in the 1979 NFL draft, and wide receiver / kicker Mike McTague was selected in the 1979 CFL draft. McTague and quarterback Mark Speral are inductees of the university's athletic hall of fame.

== Scoring summary ==
Scoring summary

Quarter	Time	Drive			Team	Scoring information	Score	
Quarter	Time	Plays	Yards	TOP	Team	Scoring information	NDS	JSU
1			45		JSU	James Coleman 1-yard touchdown run, Rocky Riddle kick good	0	7
1					JSU	27-yard field goal by Rocky Riddle	0	10
2					JSU	Butch Barker 5-yard touchdown reception from Bobby Ray Green, Rocky Riddle kick good	0	17
2					JSU	Randy Walker 1-yard touchdown reception from Bobby Ray Green, Rocky Riddle kick good	0	24
3					JSU	Bobby Ray Green 5-yard touchdown run, Rocky Riddle kick good	0	31
4	13:00	8	56		NDS	Gordy Sprattler 2-yard touchdown run, Mike McTague kick good	7	31
"TOP" = time of possession. For other American football terms, see Glossary of American football.							7	31
