= 1977 Cal State Hayward Pioneers football team =

American college football season

1977 Cal State Hayward Pioneers football
- Conference: Far Western Conference
- Record: 6–3–1 (2–2–1 FWC)
- Head coach: Tim Tierney (3rd season)
- Home stadium: Pioneer Stadium

1977 Far Western Conference football standings
	Conf.					Overall
Team	W		L		T	W		L		T
No. 3 UC Davis $^	5	–	0	–	0	11	–	1	–	0
Chico State	3	–	1	–	1	6	–	2	–	1
Cal State Hayward	2	–	2	–	1	6	–	3	–	1
San Francisco State	2	–	3	–	0	5	–	5	–	0
Humboldt State	1	–	3	–	1	5	–	4	–	1
Sacramento State	0	–	4	–	1	0	–	10	–	1
$ – Conference champion; ^ – NCAA Division II playoff participant; Rankings from Associated Press poll

The 1977 Cal State Hayward Pioneers football team represented California State University, Hayward—now known as California State University, East Bay—as a member of the Far Western Conference (FWC) during the 1977 NCAA Division II football season. Led by third-year head coach Tim Tierney, Cal State Hayward compiled an overall record of 6–3–1 with a mark of 2–2–1 in conference play, placing third in the FWC. The team outscored its opponents 209 to 136 for the season. The Pioneers played home games at Pioneer Stadium in Hayward, California.

== Schedule ==
Date	Opponent	Site	Result	Attendance	Source
September 17	Cal State Northridge*	Pioneer Stadium; Hayward, CA	W 13–3		
September 24	Cal State Los Angeles*	Pioneer Stadium; Hayward, CA	W 38–7	2,000	
October 1	at Saint Mary's*	Saint Mary's Stadium; Moraga, CA	W 31–10		
October 8	UC Davis	Pioneer Stadium; Hayward, CA	L 0–6	3,000	
October 15	at San Francisco State	Cox Stadium; San Francisco, CA	L 10–16	1,690	
October 29	Chico State	Pioneer Stadium; Hayward, CA	T 7–7		
November 5	Santa Clara*	Pioneer Stadium; Hayward, CA	W 36–29		
November 12	at Sacramento State	Hornet Stadium; Sacramento, CA	W 27–14	2,000	
November 19	Humboldt State	Pioneer Stadium; Hayward, CA	W 25–16	1,500	
November 26	at Cal Poly Pomona*	Kellogg Field; Pomona, CA	L 22–28	2,000	
*Non-conference game
