= 1977 Northern Iowa Panthers football team =

American college football season

1977 Northern Iowa Panthers football
- Conference: North Central Conference
- Record: 6–5 (4–3 NCC)
- Head coach: Stan Sheriff (18th season)
- Defensive coordinator: Dennis Remmert (7th season)
- Home stadium: UNI-Dome

1977 North Central Conference football standings
	Conf.					Overall
Team	W		L		T	W		L		T
No. 1 North Dakota State $^	6	–	0	–	1	9	–	2	–	1
Augustana (SD)	4	–	3	–	0	7	–	4	–	0
Northern Iowa	4	–	3	–	0	6	–	5	–	0
South Dakota State	3	–	3	–	1	5	–	4	–	1
Nebraska–Omaha *	2	–	2	–	3	3	–	6	–	2
North Dakota	2	–	4	–	1	4	–	7	–	1
South Dakota *	2	–	4	–	1	4	–	7	–	0
Morningside	1	–	5	–	1	2	–	6	–	1
$ – Conference champion; ^ – NCAA Division II playoff participant; * – Nebraska–Omaha and South Dakota split two head-to-head games, which counted as a tie for each team in the conference standings.; Rankings from AP Poll

The 1977 Northern Iowa Panthers football team was an American football team that represented the University of Northern Iowa as a member of the North Central Conference (NCC) during the 1977 NCAA Division II football season. In its 18th season under head coach Stan Sheriff, the team compiled a 6–5 record (4–3 in conference games) and tied for second place in the NCC. The Panthers' 58-0 loss to North Dakota State was the program's largest margin of defeat since 1914.

The team's statistical leaders included freshman halfback Kelly Ellis (853 rushing yards, 60 points scored), junior quarterback Terry Allen (970 passing yards), and sophomore wide receiver Mark Hendrickson (334 receiving yards). Three Northern Iowa players were named to the all-NCC team: Ellis; offensive tackle Kevin Barz; and center Jim Spahn.

The team played its home games at the UNI-Dome in Cedar Falls, Iowa.

== Schedule ==
Date	Opponent	Site	Result	Attendance	Source
September 3	Northeast Missouri State*	UNI-Dome; Cedar Falls, IA	L 21–31	11,900	
September 10	at Northern Michigan*	Marquette, MI	L 7–41	8,300	
September 17	at Eastern Illinois*	UNI-Dome; Cedar Falls, IA	W 31–21	8,100	
September 24	at No. 6 North Dakota State	Dacotah Field; Fargo, ND	L 0–58	6,200	
October 1	North Dakota	UNI-Dome; Cedar Falls, IA	W 9–6	9,200	
October 8	Augustana (SD)	UNI-Dome; Cedar Falls, IA	L 27–35	12,700	
October 15	Nebraska–Omaha	UNI-Dome; Cedar Falls, IA	L 17–19	6,700	
October 22	at Morningside	Sioux City, IA	W 30–13	1,850	
October 29	at South Dakota State	Coughlin–Alumni Stadium; Brookings, SD	W 23–12	1,280	
November 5	South Dakota	UNI-Dome; Cedar Falls, IA	W 34–14	10,500	
November 12	St. Cloud State*	UNI-Dome; Cedar Falls, IA	W 27–14	8,500	
*Non-conference game; Rankings from AP Poll released prior to the game
