= 1977 Sacramento State Hornets football team =

American college football season

1977 Sacramento State Hornets football
- Conference: Far Western Conference
- Record: 0–10–1 (0–4–1 FWC)
- Head coach: Glenn Brady (2nd season)
- Home stadium: Hornet Stadium

1977 Far Western Conference football standings
	Conf.					Overall
Team	W		L		T	W		L		T
No. 3 UC Davis $^	5	–	0	–	0	11	–	1	–	0
Chico State	3	–	1	–	1	6	–	2	–	1
Cal State Hayward	2	–	2	–	1	6	–	3	–	1
San Francisco State	2	–	3	–	0	5	–	5	–	0
Humboldt State	1	–	3	–	1	5	–	4	–	1
Sacramento State	0	–	4	–	1	0	–	10	–	1
$ – Conference champion; ^ – NCAA Division II playoff participant; Rankings from Associated Press poll

The 1977 Sacramento State Hornets football team represented California State University, Sacramento as a member of the Far Western Conference (FWC) during the 1977 NCAA Division II football season. Led by Glenn Brady in his second and final season as head coach, Sacramento State compiled an overall record of 0–10–1 with a mark of 0–4–1 in conference play, placing last out of six team in the FWC. The team was outscored by its opponents 379 to 71 for the season and was shut out by scores of 56–0 against Louisiana Tech and 75–0 against Nevada. The Hornets played home games at Hornet Stadium in Sacramento, California.

== Schedule ==
Date	Opponent	Site	Result	Attendance	Source
September 10	at Louisiana Tech*	State Fair Stadium; Shreveport, Louisiana	L 0–56	14,746	
September 17	at Santa Clara*	Buck Shaw Stadium; Santa Clara, CA	L 5–37	4,220	
September 24	Cal Poly*	Hornet Stadium; Sacramento, CA	L 7–31	4,500	
October 1	Cal State Los Angeles	Hornet Stadium; Sacramento, CA	L 10–13	1,500–4,000	
October 8	at Humboldt State	Redwood Bowl; Arcata, CA	T 21–21	4,000	
October 15	at UC Davis	Toomey Field; Davis, California (rivalry)	L 0–28	7,900–8,000	
October 22	San Francisco State	Hornet Stadium; Sacramento, CA	L 7–19	2,976–3,000	
October 29	at No. 7 Nevada*	Mackay Stadium; Reno, NV	L 0–75	5,840	
November 5	at Chico State	University Stadium; Chico, CA	L 7–36	2,572	
November 12	Cal State Hayward	Hornet Stadium; Sacramento, CA	L 14–27	2,000	
November 19	Cal State Northridge*	Hornet Stadium; Sacramento, CA	L 0–36	2,500	
*Non-conference game; Rankings from Associated Press Poll released prior to the game
