= 1977 North Carolina A&T Aggies football team =

American college football season

1977 North Carolina A&T Aggies football
- Conference: Mid-Eastern Athletic Conference
- Record: 7–4 (5–1 MEAC)
- Head coach: James McKinley (1st season)
- Home stadium: World War Memorial Stadium

1977 Mid-Eastern Athletic Conference football standings
	Conf.					Overall
Team	W		L		T	W		L		T
No. 4 South Carolina State $	6	–	0	–	0	9	–	1	–	1
North Carolina A&T	5	–	1	–	0	7	–	4	–	0
Delaware State	4	–	2	–	0	7	–	4	–	0
Morgan State	3	–	3	–	0	4	–	6	–	1
Howard	2	–	4	–	0	5	–	5	–	0
Maryland Eastern Shore	1	–	5	–	0	3	–	8	–	0
North Carolina Central	0	–	6	–	0	1	–	10	–	0
$ – Conference champion; Rankings from Associated Press poll

The 1977 North Carolina A&T Aggies football team represented North Carolina A&T State University as a member of the Mid-Eastern Athletic Conference (MEAC) during the 1977 NCAA Division II football season. Led by first-year head coach James McKinley, the Aggies compiled an overall record of 7–4, with a mark of 5–1 in conference play, and finished second in the MEAC.

== Schedule ==
Date	Opponent	Site	Result	Attendance	Source
September 3	Winston-Salem State*	World War Memorial Stadium; Greensboro, NC	L 14–33	20,000	
September 17	at South Carolina State	State College Stadium; Orangeburg, SC	L 0–52	11,823	
September 24	at Bethune–Cookman*	Orlando Stadium; Orlando, FL	L 15–20	4,458	
October 1	Johnson C. Smith*	World War Memorial Stadium; Greensboro, NC	W 44–20	5,000	
October 8	at Norfolk State*	Foreman Field; Norfolk, VA	W 21–14	19,000	
October 15	Maryland Eastern Shore^{†}	World War Memorial Stadium; Greensboro, NC	W 49–0	20,000	
October 22	Howard	World War Memorial Stadium; Greensboro, NC	W 34–10	8,000	
October 29	at Morgan State	Hughes Stadium; Baltimore, MD	W 28–0	18,500	
November 5	Eastern Michigan*	World War Memorial Stadium; Greensboro, NC	L 20–21	5,000	
November 12	at Delaware State	Alumni Stadium; Dover, DE	W 22–7	3,600	
November 19	North Carolina Central	World War Memorial Stadium; Greensboro, NC (rivalry)	W 25–6	15,000	
*Non-conference game; ^{†}Homecoming
