= 1977 Humboldt State Lumberjacks football team =

American college football season

1977 Humboldt State Lumberjacks football
- Conference: Far Western Conference
- Record: 5–4–1 (1–3–1 FWC)
- Head coach: Bud Van Deren (12th season)
- Home stadium: Redwood Bowl

1977 Far Western Conference football standings
	Conf.					Overall
Team	W		L		T	W		L		T
No. 3 UC Davis $^	5	–	0	–	0	11	–	1	–	0
Chico State	3	–	1	–	1	6	–	2	–	1
Cal State Hayward	2	–	2	–	1	6	–	3	–	1
San Francisco State	2	–	3	–	0	5	–	5	–	0
Humboldt State	1	–	3	–	1	5	–	4	–	1
Sacramento State	0	–	4	–	1	0	–	10	–	1
$ – Conference champion; ^ – NCAA Division II playoff participant; Rankings from Associated Press poll

The 1977 Humboldt State Lumberjacks football team represented Humboldt State University—now known as California State Polytechnic University, Humboldt—as a member of the Far Western Conference (FWC) during the 1977 NCAA Division II football season. Led by 12th-year head coach Bud Van Deren, the Lumberjacks compiled an overall record of 5–4–1 with a mark of 1–3–1 in conference play, placing fifth in the FWC. The team outscored its opponents 200 to 185 for the season. Humboldt State played home games at the Redwood Bowl in Arcata, California.

== Schedule ==
Date	Opponent	Site	Result	Attendance	Source
September 17	Humboldt State alumni*	Redwood Bowl; Arcata, CA	W 34–13	1,500	
September 24	Willamette*	Redwood Bowl; Arcata, CA	W 24–7	3,500	
October 1	Puget Sound*	Redwood Bowl; Arcata, CA	L 21–35	4,500	
October 8	Sacramento State	Redwood Bowl; Arcata, CA	T 21–21	4,000	
October 15	at Santa Clara*	Buck Shaw Stadium; Santa Clara, CA	W 5–0	7,150	
October 22	UC Davis	Redwood Bowl; Arcata, CA	L 14–27	6,500	
October 29	at San Francisco State	Cox Stadium; San Francisco, CA	W 19–13	2,625	
November 5	at Simon Fraser*	Thunderbird Stadium; University Endowment Lands, BC	W 30–23	2,000	
November 12	at Chico State	University Stadium; Chico, CA	L 16–21	2,360–2,362	
November 19	at Cal State Hayward	Pioneer Stadium; Hayward, CA	L 16–25	1,500	
*Non-conference game
