= 1977 Bucknell Bison football team =

American college football season

1977 Bucknell Bison football
- Conference: Independent
- Record: 4–5
- Head coach: Bob Curtis (3rd season)
- Captains: Bill Clifford; Dave Devonshuk; Tom Hislop
- Home stadium: Memorial Stadium

1977 NCAA Division II independents football records
	Conf.			Overall
Team	W	L	T	W		L		T
No. 8 Lehigh ^		–		12	–	2	–	0
UNLV		–		9	–	2	–	0
Kentucky State		–		8	–	2	–	1
No. T–5 Nevada		–		8	–	3	–	0
Central Connecticut		–		7	–	3	–	0
Northern Michigan ^		–		7	–	3	–	0
Youngstown State		–		7	–	3	–	0
Portland State		–		7	–	4	–	0
Delaware		–		6	–	3	–	1
Akron		–		6	–	4	–	1
American International		–		5	–	4	–	1
West Chester		–		5	–	5	–	0
Central State (OH)		–		5	–	6	–	0
Arkansas–Pine Bluff		–		4	–	5	–	1
Bucknell		–		4	–	5	–	0
Southern Connecticut State		–		4	–	6	–	0
Northeastern		–		3	–	6	–	1
Northern Colorado		–		3	–	7	–	0
Santa Clara		–		2	–	7	–	1
Eastern Illinois		–		1	–	10	–	0
^ – NCAA Division II playoff participant; Rankings from Associated Press poll

The 1977 Bucknell Bison football team was an American football team that represented Bucknell University as an independent during the 1977 NCAA Division II football season.

In their third year under head coach Bob Curtis, the Bison compiled a 4–5 record. Bill Clifford, Dave Devonshuk and Tom Hislop were the team captains.

Bucknell played its home games at Memorial Stadium on the university campus in Lewisburg, Pennsylvania.

== Schedule ==
Date	Opponent	Site	Result	Attendance	Source
September 17	at Rutgers	Rutgers Stadium; Piscataway, NJ	L 14–36	14,500	
September 24	Davidson^{†}	Memorial Stadium; Lewisburg, PA	W 44–12	2,500	
October 1	C.W. Post	Memorial Stadium; Lewisburg, PA	L 0–23	1,000	
October 8	at Lafayette	Fisher Field; Easton, PA	L 7–34	7,500–8,000	
October 15	West Chester	Memorial Stadium; Lewisburg, PA	W 24–13	2,200	
October 22	Gettysburg^	Memorial Stadium; Lewisburg, PA	W 34–0	6,500	
October 29	at Lehigh	Taylor Stadium; Bethlehem, PA	L 13–47	11,000–11,500	
November 5	at Colgate	Andy Kerr Stadium; Hamilton, NY	L 17–49	6,500	
November 12	Rochester	Memorial Stadium; Lewisburg, PA	W 40–14	2,000	
^{†}Homecoming; ^ Parents Weekend
