= 1977 Morgan State Bears football team =

American college football season

1977 Morgan State Bears football
- Conference: Mid-Eastern Athletic Conference
- Record: 4–6–1 (3–3 MEAC)
- Head coach: Henry Lattimore (2nd season)
- Home stadium: Hughes Stadium

1977 Mid-Eastern Athletic Conference football standings
	Conf.					Overall
Team	W		L		T	W		L		T
No. 4 South Carolina State $	6	–	0	–	0	9	–	1	–	1
North Carolina A&T	5	–	1	–	0	7	–	4	–	0
Delaware State	4	–	2	–	0	7	–	4	–	0
Morgan State	3	–	3	–	0	4	–	6	–	1
Howard	2	–	4	–	0	5	–	5	–	0
Maryland Eastern Shore	1	–	5	–	0	3	–	8	–	0
North Carolina Central	0	–	6	–	0	1	–	10	–	0
$ – Conference champion; Rankings from Associated Press poll

The 1977 Morgan State Bears football team represented Morgan State University as a member of the Mid-Eastern Athletic Conference (MEAC) during the 1977 NCAA Division II football season. Led by second-year head coach Henry Lattimore, the Bears compiled an overall record of 4–6–1, and a mark of 3–3 in conference play, and finished fourth in the MEAC.

== Schedule ==
Date	Opponent	Site	Result	Attendance	Source
September 10	Virginia State*	Hughes Stadium; Baltimore, MD	W 19–0	12,450	
September 17	vs. Grambling State*	Yankee Stadium; Bronx, NY	L 19–35	34,403	
September 24	at Delaware*	Delaware Stadium; Newark, DE	T 29–29	18,422	
October 1	at North Carolina Central	O'Kelly Stadium; Durham, NC	W 35–25	6,500	
October 8	Maryland Eastern Shore	Hughes Stadium; Baltimore, MD	W 14–0		
October 15	at No. 1 South Carolina State	State College Stadium; Orangeburg, SC	L 13–63	5,722	
October 22	at Delaware State	Alumni Stadium; Dover, DE	L 6–20		
October 29	North Carolina A&T^{†}	Hughes Stadium; Baltimore, MD	L 0–28	18,500	
November 5	at Virginia Union*	Hovey Field; Richmond, VA	L 9–28	1,000	
November 12	at Jackson State*	Mississippi Veterans Memorial Stadium; Jackson, MS	L 14–31		
November 19	Howard	Hughes Stadium; Baltimore, MD (rivalry)	W 33–24	5,100	
*Non-conference game; ^{†}Homecoming; Rankings from Coaches' Poll released prior to the game
