= 1977 South Dakota Coyotes football team =

American college football season

1977 South Dakota Coyotes football
- Conference: North Central Conference
- Record: 4–7 (2–4–1 NCC)
- Head coach: Beanie Cooper (3rd season)
- Captains: Matt Kiger; Mike Maguire
- Home stadium: Inman Field

1977 North Central Conference football standings
	Conf.					Overall
Team	W		L		T	W		L		T
No. 1 North Dakota State $^	6	–	0	–	1	9	–	2	–	1
Augustana (SD)	4	–	3	–	0	7	–	4	–	0
Northern Iowa	4	–	3	–	0	6	–	5	–	0
South Dakota State	3	–	3	–	1	5	–	4	–	1
Nebraska–Omaha *	2	–	2	–	3	3	–	6	–	2
North Dakota	2	–	4	–	1	4	–	7	–	1
South Dakota *	2	–	4	–	1	4	–	7	–	0
Morningside	1	–	5	–	1	2	–	6	–	1
$ – Conference champion; ^ – NCAA Division II playoff participant; * – Nebraska–Omaha and South Dakota split two head-to-head games, which counted as a tie for each team in the conference standings.; Rankings from AP Poll

The 1977 South Dakota Coyotes football team represented the University of South Dakota in the 1977 NCAA Division II football season as a member of the North Central Conference (NCC). Led by third-year coach Beanie Cooper, the Coyotes compiled an overall record of 4–7 and a mark of 2–4–1 in conference play, tying for sixth place in the NCC. The team played two games against Nebraska–Omaha in order to save money on travel; each game counted as a half-game in the conference standings.

Running back Mike Maguire rushed for 271 yards in the Coyotes' November 12 game against Nebraska–Omaha, breaking both the school's single-game rushing record of 220 yards and the NCC record of 257 yards. The Associated Press named Maguire one of their two NCC players of the week for his performance. Maguire and linebacker Matt Kiger were selected as the team's captains prior to the season.

Five South Dakota players were selected as first-team players on the 1977 All-North Central Conference football team: Maguire at running back; Mike Lee at offensive guard; Kiger at linebacker; Clyde McCormick at cornerback; and Dave Schwab as a defensive lineman.

== Schedule ==
Date	Opponent	Site	Result	Attendance	Source
September 3	at Nebraska–Omaha	Al F. Caniglia Field; Omaha, NE	L 16–17	10,000	
September 10	Morningside	Inman Field; Vermillion, SD	W 24–10	7,000–7,100	
September 17	at Northern Colorado*	Greeley, CO	L 10–13	900	
September 24	at Northeast Missouri State*	Stokes Stadium; Kirksville, MO	L 7–19	5,000	
October 1	Augustana (SD)	Inman Field; Vermillion, SD	L 8–14	2,500	
October 8	North Dakota^{†}	Inman Field; Vermillion, SD (Sitting Bull Trophy)	L 0–20	9,000	
October 15	at Western Illinois*	Hanson Field; Macomb, IL	W 17–16	13,500	
October 22	at South Dakota State	Coughlin–Alumni Stadium; Brookings, SD (Hobo Day, rivalry)	W 15–10	15,193	
October 29	at No. 4 North Dakota State	Dacotah Field; Fargo, ND	L 6–9	5,100	
November 5	at Northern Iowa	UNI-Dome; Cedar Falls, IA	L 14–34	10,500	
November 12	at Nebraska–Omaha	Inman Field; Vermillion, SD	W 35–14	1,000	
*Non-conference game; ^{†}Homecoming; Rankings from AP Poll released prior to the game

== Before the season ==
South Dakota finished the 1976 season with a record of four wins, five losses, and one tie (4–5–1, 3–2–1 in NCC play). Quarterbacks Scott Pollock and Steve Winkel had competed for the starting role in that season, and both returned to the team in 1977; three other quarterbacks, Tim Cooper, Eddie Miller, and Jay Monfore, also joined the team during the offseason. Pollock was ultimately chosen to start in the team's first game against Nebraska–Omaha.

== Game summaries ==
=== At Nebraska–Omaha ===
Week 1: South Dakota at Nebraska-Omaha

Team	1	2	3	4	Total
South Dakota	0	0	3	13	16
• Nebraska-Omaha	7	2	0	8	17

- Date: Sept 3
- Location: Omaha, NE
- Game attendance: 10,000

Scoring summary
1	UNO	Bobby Bass 4-yard run (Mark Schlect kick)	UNO 7-0
2	UNO	Safety, Steve Winkel tackled in end zone	UNO 9-0
3	SD	Knud Nielsen 36-yard field goal	UNO 9-3
4	SD	Mike Maguire 1-yard run (kick blocked)	TIE 9-9
4	SD	Maguire 82-yard run (Nielsen kick)	UNO 16-9
4	UNO	Jim Ripa 1-yard run (Bass pass from Bownkamp)	UNO 17-16

On September 3, South Dakota opened its season with a 17–16 loss to the Nebraska–Omaha Mavericks. The game drew a record crowd of 10,000 to Al F. Caniglia Field in Omaha, Nebraska. Nebraska-Omaha took a 9–0 lead at halftime on a touchdown run by Bobby Bass and a safety. South Dakota came back with 16 unanswered points in the third and fourth quarters to take a 16–9 lead. South Dakota running back Mike Maguire, who totaled 155 rushing yards in the game, scored two touchdowns in the final five minutes of the game. His second touchdown came on an 82-yard run with 2:49 remaining. Nebraska then drove down the field for a touchdown and successfully converted a two-point conversion with 1:31 remaining.

=== Morningside ===
Week 2: Morningside at South Dakota

Team	1	2	3	4	Total
Morningside	7	0	3	0	10
• South Dakota	3	0	6	15	24

- Date: Sept 10
- Location: Vermillion, SD
- Game attendance: > 7,000

Scoring summary
1	MORN	Greg Mieras 4-yard run (Rick Schramek kick)	MORN 7-0
1	SD	Knud Nielsen 32-yard field goal	MORN 7-3
3	MORN	Schranmek 32-yard field goal	MORN 10-3
3	SD	Mike Maguire 89-yard run (kick failed)	MORN 10-9
4	SD	Brian Barns 2-yard run (Russ Dokken pass from Steve Winkel	SD 17-10
4	SD	Winkel 46-yard run (Nielsen kick))	SD 24-10

On September 10, South Dakota won its home opener, defeating the Morningside Chiefs by a 24–10 score before a crowd of more than 7,000 at Inman Field in Vermillion, South Dakota. Morningside led, 7–3, at halftime, but the Coyotes outscored Morningside, 21–3, in the second half. Quarterback Steve Winkel led the comeback with key passes, and running back Mike Maguire ran for a total of 146 yards on 16 carries, including a school-record 89-yard touchdown in the third quarter. The victory was the 100th of Beanie Cooper's head coaching career. Linebacker Dave Combs recorded 17 tackles for the Coyotes.

=== At Northern Colorado ===
Week 3: South Dakota at Northern Colorado

Team	1	2	3	4	Total
South Dakota	0	10	0	0	10
• Northern Colorado	0	3	0	10	13

- Date: Sept 17
- Location: Greeley, CO

Scoring summary
2		SD	Knud Nielsen 48-yard field goal	SD 3-0
2		SD	Jerry Biezuns 13-yard pass from Steve Winkel (Nielsen kick)	SD 10-0
2		NCCOL	Dale Stone 23-yard field goal	SD 10-3
4		NCOL	Jim Goodenberger 2-yard run (Stone kick)	TIE 10-10
4	0:06	NCOL	Stone 27-yard field goal	NCOL 13-10

On September 17, South Dakota played a road game against the Northern Colorado Bears, losing by a 13–10 score at Greeley, Colorado. The Coyotes led, 10-3, at halftime following a 48-yard field goal from Knud Nielsen and a 13-yard touchdown pass from Steve Winkel to Jerry Biezuns. The Coyotes were unable to score in the second half while Northern Colorado scored 10 points in the fourth quarter. Late in the third quarter, Mike Maguire fumbled a punt, giving Northern Colorado possession at the Coyotes' 28-yard line. A personal foul penalty advanced the ball to the 14, and Jim Goodenberger ran for the tying touchdown. Late in the game, Northern Colorado converted a fourth-and-six play to advance the ball to the Coyotes' 27-yard line. With six seconds remaining in the game, Dale Stone kicked the game-winning field goal. South Dakota out-gained Northern Colorado by 257 yards to 178, but the Coyotes turned the ball over six times.

=== At Northeast Missouri State ===
Week 4: South Dakota at Northeast Missouri State

Team	1	2	3	4	Total
South Dakota	0	0	7	0	7
• Northeast Missouri	13	6	0	0	19

- Date: Sept 24
- Location: Kirksville, MO

Scoring summary
1	NEMO	Steve Rampy 26-yard pass to Lloyd Henry (Kent Fenson kick)	NEMO 7-0
1	NEMO	Steve Powell 4-yard run (pass failed)	NEMO 13-0
2	NEMO	Rampy 1-yard run (kick failed)	NEMO 19-0
4	SD	Kevin Boehmer 10-yard run (Knud Nielsen kick)	NEMO 19-7

On September 24, South Dakota lost a road game against Northeast Missouri State, falling by a 19–7 score in Kirksville, Missouri. Due to injuries, the Coyotes played the game without the team's star running back Mike Maguire (twisted knee) and without starting quarterback Steve Winkel (broken hand). Coach Cooper's son, Tim Cooper, took over at quarterback and fumbled in the first quarter, leading to Northeast Missouri State's first touchdown. Northeast Missouri running back rushed for 184 yards on 25 carries. Northeast Missouri State out-gained the Coyotes by 367 yards to 202.

=== North Dakota ===
Week 6: North Dakota at South Dakota

Team	1	2	3	4	Total
• North Dakota	0	14	0	6	20
South Dakota	0	0	0	0	0

- Date: Oct 8
- Location: Vermillion, SD

Scoring summary
2	UND	Kirk Anderson 1-yard run (Tom Biolo kick)	UND 7-0
2	UND	Anderson 1-yard run (Biolo kick)	UND 14-0
4	UND	Tony Veith 1-yard run (kick failed)	UND 20-0

On October 8, South Dakota was shut out, 20-0, in its annual rivalry game with the North Dakota Fighting Sioux. North Dakota scored two touchdowns in the second quarter and one in the fourth. Two of the touchdowns came after the defense intercepted Coyote passes. In all, North Dakota's defense tallied four interceptions and recovered three of six South Dakota fumbles. South Dakota had a touchdown erased due to a penalty and also missed a field goal.

=== At Western Illinois ===
Week 7: South Dakota at Western Illinois

Team	1	2	3	4	Total
• South Dakota	3	7	0	7	17
Western Illinois	10	6	0	0	16

- Date: Oct 15
- Location: Macomb, IL

Scoring summary
1	WI	Don Vock 35-yard field goal	WI 3-0
1	SD	Knud Nielsen 24-yard field goal	TIE 3-3
1	WI	Jerry Holloway 47-yard pass from Mark Jehn (Vock kick)	WI 10-3
2	USD	Brian Barnes 1-yard run (Nielsen kick)	TIE 10-10
2	WI	Mike Shadley 10-yard pass from Jehn (kick failed)	WI 16-10
4	USD	Kevin Cusick 1-yard run (Nielsen kick)	USD 17-16

On October 15, South Dakota defeated the Western Illinois Leathernecks, 17–16, at Hanson Field in Macomb, Illinois. The Coyotes trailed, 16–10, at halftime. After a scoreless third quarter, the Coyotes drove 80 yards beginning with 5:35 remaining in the game. Kevin Cusick scored on a one-yard run, and Knud Nielsen's extra point gave South Dakota the led with 56 seconds remaining. The Coyotes rushed for 274 yards, led by Mike Maguire with 120 yards and Scott Pollock with 87 yards. Western Illinois quarterback completed 7 of 23 passes for 178 yards. The victory snapped South Dakota's four-game losing streak.

=== At South Dakota State ===
Week 8: South Dakota at South Dakota State

Team	1	2	3	4	Total
• South Dakota	0	6	6	3	15
South Dakota State	7	0	3	0	10

- Date: Oct 22
- Location: Brookings, SD
- Game attendance: 15,193

Scoring summary
1	SDSU	Gary Maffett 81-yard run (Doug Schlosser kick)	SDSU 7-0
2	USD	Kevin Cusick 1-yard run (kick failed)	SDSU 7-6
3	USD	Hugh Venrick 13-yard pass from Scott Pollock (run failed)	USD 12-7
3	SDSU	Schlosser 32-yard field goal	USD 12-10
4	USD	Knud Nielsen 40-yard field goal	USD 15-10

On October 22, South Dakota won its annual "Hobo Day" rivalry game against the South Dakota State Jackrabbits by a 15–10 score. The game was played before a crowd of 15,193 at Coughlin–Alumni Stadium in Brookings, South Dakota. South Dakota State took an early lead when Gary Maffett ran 81 yards for a touchdown in the first quarter. The Coyotes came from behind, scoring touchdowns in the second and third quarters and kicking a field goal in the fourth quarter. Mike Maguire rushed for 112 yards on 30 carries, while Kevin Cusick and Scott Pollock added 70 and 65 rushing yards, respectively.

=== At North Dakota State ===
Week 9: South Dakota at North Dakota State

Team	1	2	3	4	Total
South Dakota	0	0	3	3	6
• North Dakota State	3	6	0	0	9

- Date: Oct 29
- Location: Fargo, ND

Scoring summary
1	NDSU	Mike McTague	NDSU 3-0
2	NDSU	Gordy Sprattler 4-yard run (run failed)	NDSU 9-0
3	USD	Knud Nielsen 21-yard field goal	NDSU 9-3
4	USD	Knud Nielsen 31-yard field goal	NDSU 9-6

On October 29, South Dakota lost to the North Dakota State Bison by a 9–6 score. Despite the loss, the Coyotes' defense held the Bison to 159 rushing yards (half of their season average) and nine points (24 points lower than their season average).

=== Nebraska–Omaha ===
Week 11: Nebraska–Omaha at South Dakota

Team	1	2	3	4	Total
Nebraska-Omaha	0	0	7	7	14
• South Dakota	7	7	7	14	35

- Date: Nov 12
- Location: Vermillion, SD

Scoring summary
1	SD	Kevin Cusick 2-yard run (Knud Nielsen kick)	SD 7-0
2	SD	Cusick 3-yard run (Nielsen kick)	SD 14-0
3	SD	Mike Maguire 67-yard run (Nielsen kick)	SD 21-0
3	UNO	Bobby Bass 11-yard pass from Mike Mancuso (Mark Schlecht kick)	SD 21-7
4	SD	Hugh Venrick 13-yard pass from Bill Moats (Nielseen kick)	SD 28-7
4	UNO	Bass 1-yard run (Schlecht kick)	SD 28-14
4	SD	Maguire 51-yard run (Nielsen kick)	SD 35-14

On November 12, South Dakota closed its 1977 season with a 35–14 victory over Nebraska–Omaha at Inman Field in Vermillion. It was the second game of the season between the two schools. South Dakota rushed for 399 rushing yards while holding Nebraska–Omaha to only 31 rushing yards. Running back Mike Maguire led the attack and set school and NCC records with 271 rushing yards on 37 carries. He concluded the season with 983 rushing yards in nine games, having missed two games with a knee injury. Defensive back Bill Moats intercepted a pass and also threw a 13-yard touchdown pass on a fake field goal. Moats was also the team's punter and broke the school's season record with an average of 42.1 yards per punt.

== Roster ==
1977 South Dakota Coyotes football team roster
Players
Coaches
Offense

Pos.	#	Name	Class
QB		Tim Cooper
RB		Kevin Cusick
RB		Mike Maguire
G		Mike Lee
QB		Scott Pollock
QB		Steve Winkel
WR		Vince Duncombe
C		Mike Schurrer
G		Monte Beck
OT		Mike Murphey
OT		Ed Sundby
TE		Hugh Venrick
WR		Doug Smith

Defense

Pos.	#	Name	Class
LB		Matt Kiger
CB		Clyde McCormick
DB		Bill Moats
DL		Dave Schwab
DL		Bob Potvin
DL		Dave Hultgren
DL		Mark Salstrand
DL		Tim Cheever
DL		Bob DeGeest
LB		David Combs
LB		Ben Long
DB		John Austin
DB		Bob Gruber

Special teams

Pos.	#	Name	Class
PK		Knud Nielsen
P		Bill Moats

Head coach

- Beanie Cooper

Coordinators/assistant coaches

Legend

- (C) Team captain
- (S) Suspended
- (I) Ineligible
- Injured
- Redshirt
