= 1977 Maryland Eastern Shore Hawks football team =

American college football season

1977 Maryland Eastern Shore Hawks football
- Conference: Mid-Eastern Athletic Conference
- Record: 3–8 (1–5 MEAC)
- Head coach: Harold Gray (5th season)

1977 Mid-Eastern Athletic Conference football standings
	Conf.					Overall
Team	W		L		T	W		L		T
No. 4 South Carolina State $	6	–	0	–	0	9	–	1	–	1
North Carolina A&T	5	–	1	–	0	7	–	4	–	0
Delaware State	4	–	2	–	0	7	–	4	–	0
Morgan State	3	–	3	–	0	4	–	6	–	1
Howard	2	–	4	–	0	5	–	5	–	0
Maryland Eastern Shore	1	–	5	–	0	3	–	8	–	0
North Carolina Central	0	–	6	–	0	1	–	10	–	0
$ – Conference champion; Rankings from Associated Press poll

The 1977 Maryland Eastern Shore Hawks football team represented the University of Maryland Eastern Shore as a member of the Mid-Eastern Athletic Conference (MEAC) during the 1977 NCAA Division II football season. Led by fifth-year head coach Harold Gray, the Hawks compiled an overall record of 3–8, with a mark of 1–5 in conference play, and finished sixth in the MEAC.

== Schedule ==
Date	Opponent	Site	Result	Attendance	Source
September 10	at Towson State*	Burdick Field; Towson, MD	L 12–13		
September 17	at Howard	Howard Stadium; Washington, DC	L 0–15	4,000	
September 24	Livingstone*	Princess Anne, MD	W 14–7		
October 1	Delaware State	Princess Anne, MD	L 0–22		
October 8	at Morgan State	Hughes Stadium; Baltimore, MD	L 0–14		
October 15	at North Carolina A&T	World War Memorial Stadium; Greensboro, NC	L 0–49	20,000	
October 22	North Carolina Central	Princess Anne, MD	W 14–0		
October 29	at Fort Valley State*	Wildcat Stadium; Fort Valley, GA	L 14–17		
November 5	at No. 1 South Carolina State	State College Stadium; Orangeburg, SC	L 7–42	14,892–15,000	
November 12	Hampton*	Princess Anne, MD	L 13–15		
November 19	at Bowie State*	Bulldogs Stadium; Bowie, MD	W 20–18	200	
*Non-conference game; Rankings from Coaches' Poll released prior to the game
