= 1977 Chico State Wildcats football team =

American college football season

1977 Chico State Wildcats football
- Conference: Far Western Conference
- Record: 6–2–1 (3–1–1 FWC)
- Head coach: Dick Trimmer (4th season)
- Home stadium: University Stadium

1977 Far Western Conference football standings
	Conf.					Overall
Team	W		L		T	W		L		T
No. 3 UC Davis $^	5	–	0	–	0	11	–	1	–	0
Chico State	3	–	1	–	1	6	–	2	–	1
Cal State Hayward	2	–	2	–	1	6	–	3	–	1
San Francisco State	2	–	3	–	0	5	–	5	–	0
Humboldt State	1	–	3	–	1	5	–	4	–	1
Sacramento State	0	–	4	–	1	0	–	10	–	1
$ – Conference champion; ^ – NCAA Division II playoff participant; Rankings from Associated Press poll

The 1977 Chico State Wildcats football team represented California State University, Chico as a member of the Far Western Conference (FWC) during the 1977 NCAA Division II football season. Led by fourth-year head coach Dick Trimmer, Chico State compiled an overall record of 6–2–1 with a mark of 3–1–1 in conference play, placing second in the FWC. The team outscored its opponents 159 to 137 for the season. The Wildcats played home games at University Stadium in Chico, California.

== Schedule ==
Date	Opponent	Site	Result	Attendance	Source
September 17	at Willamette*	McCulloch Stadium; Salem, OR	W 6–0	712	
October 1	Simon Fraser*	University Stadium; Chico, CA	W 14–13	4,372	
October 8	San Francisco State	University Stadium; Chico, CA	W 32–0	3,856	
October 15	Portland State*	University Stadium; Chico, CA	L 7–27	3,976	
October 22	at Puget Sound*	Baker Stadium; Tacoma, WA	W 14–13		
October 29	at Cal State Hayward	Pioneer Stadium; Hayward, CA	T 7–7		
November 5	Sacramento State	University Stadium; Chico, CA	W 36–7	2,572	
November 12	Humboldt State	University Stadium; Chico, CA	W 21–16	2,360–2,362	
November 19	at No. 3 UC Davis	Toomey Field; Davis, CA	L 22–54	9,400–9,500	
*Non-conference game; Rankings from Associated Press Poll released prior to the game
