= 1977 North Carolina Central Eagles football team =

American college football season

1977 North Carolina Central Eagles football
- Conference: Mid-Eastern Athletic Conference
- Record: 1–10 (0–6 MEAC)
- Head coach: Willie Smith (5th season; games 1–7); Jesse Clements & Robert Jackson (interim, games 8–11)
- Home stadium: O'Kelly Stadium

1977 Mid-Eastern Athletic Conference football standings
	Conf.					Overall
Team	W		L		T	W		L		T
No. 4 South Carolina State $	6	–	0	–	0	9	–	1	–	1
North Carolina A&T	5	–	1	–	0	7	–	4	–	0
Delaware State	4	–	2	–	0	7	–	4	–	0
Morgan State	3	–	3	–	0	4	–	6	–	1
Howard	2	–	4	–	0	5	–	5	–	0
Maryland Eastern Shore	1	–	5	–	0	3	–	8	–	0
North Carolina Central	0	–	6	–	0	1	–	10	–	0
$ – Conference champion; Rankings from Associated Press poll

The 1977 North Carolina Central Eagles football team represented North Carolina Central University as a member of the Mid-Eastern Athletic Conference (MEAC) during the 1977 NCAA Division II football season. Led by fifth-year head coach Willie Smith, the Eagles compiled an overall record of 1–10, with a mark of 0–6 in conference play, and finished last in the MEAC.

Smith served as North Carolina Central's head coach for the first seven games of the season before resigning. Jesse Clements and Robert Jackson served as co-interim head coaches for the final four games.

== Schedule ==
Date	Opponent	Site	Result	Attendance	Source
September 3	Virginia Union*	O'Kelly Stadium; Durham, NC	L 10–14		
September 10	at Elizabeth City State*	Elizabeth City, NC	W 13–6		
September 17	at Winston-Salem State*	Bowman Gray Stadium; Winston-Salem, NC	L 13–21		
October 1	Morgan State	O'Kelly Stadium; Durham, NC	L 25–35	6,500	
October 8	at Elon*	Burlington Memorial Stadium; Burlington, NC	L 8–50		
October 15	Delaware State	O'Kelly Stadium; Durham, NC	L 0–23	11,000	
October 22	at Maryland Eastern Shore	Princess Anne, MD	L 0–14		
October 29	No. 2 South Carolina State	O'Kelly Stadium; Durham, NC	L 12–45	6,500–7,000	
November 5	at Johnson C. Smith*	American Legion Memorial Stadium; Charlotte, NC	L 16–18	8,000	
November 12	Howard	O'Kelly Stadium; Durham, NC	L 0–33	4,500	
November 19	at North Carolina A&T	World War Memorial Stadium; Greensboro, NC (rivalry)	L 6–25	15,000	
*Non-conference game; Rankings from AP Poll released prior to the game
