= John Konstantinos =

American football player, coach, and administrator (1936–2013)

Biographical details
- Born: August 13, 1936; Yorkville, Ohio, U.S.
- Died: March 14, 2013 (aged 76); Copley, Ohio, U.S.

Playing career
- c. 1955: Morris Harvey
- 1957: Kent State

Coaching career (HC unless noted)
- 1967–1968: Temple (assistant)
- 1969–1971: William & Mary (assistant)
- 1972–1974: NC State (ends/head recruiter)
- 1975–1977: Eastern Illinois
- 1979–1980: Arkansas (assistant)

Administrative career (AD unless noted)
- 1990–2002: Cleveland State

Head coaching record
- Overall: 9–21–2

John Konstantinos (August 13, 1936 – March 14, 2013) was an American football player, coach, and college athletics administrator. He served as the head football coach at Eastern Illinois University from 1975 to 1977, compiling a record of 9–21–2. Konstantinos was the athletic director at Cleveland State University from 1990 to 2002. Konstantinos was born on August 13, 1936, in Yorkville, Ohio. He died on March 14, 2013, in Copley, Ohio.

== Head coaching record ==
Year	Team	Overall	Conference	Standing	Bowl/playoffs
Eastern Illinois Panthers (NCAA Division II independent) (1975–1977)
1975	Eastern Illinois	3–5–2			
1976	Eastern Illinois	5–6			
1977	Eastern Illinois	1–10			
Eastern Illinois:		9–21–2			
Total:		9–21–2			
