= 1977 Princeton Tigers football team =

American college football season

1977 Princeton Tigers football
- Conference: Ivy League
- Record: 3–6 (3–4 Ivy League)
- Head coach: Robert Casciola (5th season)
- Captains: Bobby L. Isom; Lawrence P. Lutz
- Home stadium: Palmer Stadium

1977 Ivy League football standings
	Conf.					Overall
Team	W		L		T	W		L		T
Yale $	6	–	1	–	0	7	–	2	–	0
Brown	5	–	2	–	0	7	–	2	–	0
Harvard	4	–	3	–	0	4	–	5	–	0
Penn	4	–	3	–	0	5	–	4	–	0
Dartmouth	4	–	3	–	0	6	–	3	–	0
Princeton	3	–	4	–	0	3	–	6	–	0
Cornell	1	–	6	–	0	1	–	8	–	0
Columbia	1	–	6	–	0	2	–	7	–	0
$ – Conference champion

The 1977 Princeton Tigers football team was an American football team that represented Princeton University during the 1977 NCAA Division I football season. Princeton finished sixth in the Ivy League.

In their fifth and final year under head coach Robert Casciola, the Tigers compiled a 3–6 record and were outscored 144 to 137. Bobby L. Isom and Lawrence P. Lutz were the team captains.

Princeton's 3–4 conference record placed sixth in the Ivy League standings. The Tigers outscored Ivy opponents 118 to 103.

Princeton played its home games at Palmer Stadium on the university campus in Princeton, New Jersey.

== Schedule ==
Date	Opponent	Site	Result	Attendance	Source
September 17	at Dartmouth	Memorial Field; Hanover, NH	L 11–14	12,200	
September 24	Rutgers*	Palmer Stadium; Princeton, NJ (rivalry)	L 6–10	19,500	
October 1	at Brown	Brown Stadium; Providence, RI	L 7–10	8,500	
October 8	Columbia	Palmer Stadium; Princeton, NJ	W 28–7	8,483	
October 15	Colgate*	Palmer Stadium; Princeton, NJ	L 13–31	14,940	
October 22	at Harvard	Harvard Stadium; Boston, MA (rivalry)	W 20–7	19,000	
October 29	at Penn	Franklin Field; Philadelphia, PA (rivalry)	L 10-21	14,696	
November 5	Yale	Palmer Stadium; Princeton, NJ (rivalry)	L 8-44	23,142	
November 12	Cornell	Palmer Stadium; Princeton, NJ	W 34-0	8,677	
*Non-conference game
