= 1977 North Dakota State Bison football team =

American college football season

1977 North Dakota State Bison football

NCC champion

Grantland Rice Bowl, L 7–31 vs. Jacksonville State
- Conference: North Central Conference
- Record: 9–2–1 (6–0–1 NCC)
- Head coach: Jim Wacker (2nd season)
- Home stadium: Dacotah Field

1977 North Central Conference football standings
	Conf.					Overall
Team	W		L		T	W		L		T
No. 1 North Dakota State $^	6	–	0	–	1	9	–	2	–	1
Augustana (SD)	4	–	3	–	0	7	–	4	–	0
Northern Iowa	4	–	3	–	0	6	–	5	–	0
South Dakota State	3	–	3	–	1	5	–	4	–	1
Nebraska–Omaha *	2	–	2	–	3	3	–	6	–	2
North Dakota	2	–	4	–	1	4	–	7	–	1
South Dakota *	2	–	4	–	1	4	–	7	–	0
Morningside	1	–	5	–	1	2	–	6	–	1
$ – Conference champion; ^ – NCAA Division II playoff participant; * – Nebraska–Omaha and South Dakota split two head-to-head games, which counted as a tie for each team in the conference standings.; Rankings from AP Poll

The 1977 North Dakota State Bison football team was an American football team that represented North Dakota State University during the 1977 NCAA Division II football season as a member of the North Central Conference. In their second year under head coach Jim Wacker, the team compiled a 9–2–1 record, finished as NCC champion, and lost to Jacksonville State in the Grantland Rice Bowl.

== Schedule ==
Date	Opponent	Rank	Site	Result	Attendance	Source
September 3	Northern Michigan*		Dacotah Field; Fargo, ND	W 38–17	7,500	
September 10	at Nebraska–Omaha		Al F. Caniglia Field; Omaha, NE	T 17–17	10,000	
September 17	Montana State*		Dacotah Field; Fargo, ND	L 17–24	12,100	
September 24	Northern Iowa	No. 6	Dacotah Field; Fargo, ND	W 58–0	6,200	
October 1	at South Dakota State	No. 5	Coughlin–Alumni Stadium; Brookings, SD (rivalry)	W 27–14	6,176	
October 15	at Augustana (SD)	No. 6	Howard Wood Field; Sioux Falls, SD	W 44–19	6,500	
October 22	North Dakota^{†}	No. 5	Dacotah Field; Fargo, ND (Nickel Trophy)	W 45–20	13,000	
October 29	South Dakota	No. 4	Dacotah Field; Fargo, ND	W 9–6	5,100	
November 5	at Morningside	No. 2	Roberts Field; Sioux City, IA	W 65–6	579	
November 12	at Northern Colorado*	No. 2	Jackson Field; Greeley, CO	W 27–3	3,763	
November 26	No. 11 Northern Michigan*	No. 1	Dacotah Field; Fargo, ND (NCAA Division II Quarterfinal)	W 20–6	2,200	
December 3	vs. No. 9 Jacksonville State*	No. 1	Anniston Memorial Stadium; Anniston, AL (Grantland Rice Bowl—NCAA Division II Semifinal)	L 7–31	9,000	
*Non-conference game; ^{†}Homecoming; Rankings from AP Poll released prior to the game
