= 1977 Dartmouth Big Green football team =

American college football season

1977 Dartmouth Big Green football
- Conference: Ivy League
- Record: 6–3 (4–3 Ivy)
- Head coach: Jake Crouthamel (7th season)
- Captains: Curtis Oberg; James Vailas
- Home stadium: Memorial Field

1977 Ivy League football standings
| | Conf. | | | | | Overall |
| Team | W | | L | | T | W | | L | | T |
|---|---|---|---|---|---|---|---|---|---|---|
| Yale $ | 6 | – | 1 | – | 0 | 7 | – | 2 | – | 0 |
| Brown | 5 | – | 2 | – | 0 | 7 | – | 2 | – | 0 |
| Harvard | 4 | – | 3 | – | 0 | 4 | – | 5 | – | 0 |
| Penn | 4 | – | 3 | – | 0 | 5 | – | 4 | – | 0 |
| Dartmouth | 4 | – | 3 | – | 0 | 6 | – | 3 | – | 0 |
| Princeton | 3 | – | 4 | – | 0 | 3 | – | 6 | – | 0 |
| Cornell | 1 | – | 6 | – | 0 | 1 | – | 8 | – | 0 |
| Columbia | 1 | – | 6 | – | 0 | 2 | – | 7 | – | 0 |
$ – Conference champion

The 1977 Dartmouth Big Green football team was an American football team that represented Dartmouth College during the 1977 NCAA Division I football season. Dartmouth tied for third place in the Ivy League.

In their seventh and final season under head coach Jake Crouthamel, the Big Green compiled a 6–3 record and outscored opponents 141 to 92. Curtis Oberg and James Vailas were the team captains.

The Big Green's 4–3 conference record earned a three-way tie for third in the Ivy League. Dartmouth outscored Ivy opponents 86 to 82.

Dartmouth played its home games at Memorial Field on the college campus in Hanover, New Hampshire.

== Schedule ==
| Date | Opponent | Site | Result | Attendance | Source |
|---|---|---|---|---|---|
| September 17 | Princeton | Memorial Field; Hanover, NH | W 14–11 | 12,200 | |
| September 24 | Holy Cross* | Memorial Field; Hanover, NH | W 17–14 | 7,900 | |
| October 1 | at Boston University* | Nickerson Field; Boston, MA | W 38–0 | 7,320 | |
| October 8 | at Yale | Yale Bowl; New Haven, CT | W 3–0 | 24,036 | |
| October 15 | Harvard | Memorial Field; Hanover, NH (rivalry) | L 25–31 | 26,500 | |
| October 22 | Cornell | Memorial Field; Hanover, NH (rivalry) | W 17–13 | 15,000 | |
| October 29 | at Columbia | Baker Field; New York, NY | W 14–7 | 13,000 | |
| November 5 | Brown | Memorial Field; Hanover, NH | L 10–13 | 8,100 | |
| November 12 | at Penn | Franklin Field; Philadelphia, PA | L 3–7 | 14,184 | |
*Non-conference game
