= 1977 Lehigh Engineers football team =

American college football season

1977 Lehigh Engineers football

NCAA Division II champion Lambert Cup winner

NCAA Division II Championship Game—Pioneer Bowl, W 33–0 vs. Jacksonville State
- Conference: Independent
- Record: 12–2
- Head coach: John Whitehead (2nd season)
- Home stadium: Taylor Stadium

1977 NCAA Division II independents football records
	Conf.			Overall
Team	W	L	T	W		L		T
No. 8 Lehigh ^		–		12	–	2	–	0
UNLV		–		9	–	2	–	0
Kentucky State		–		8	–	2	–	1
No. T–5 Nevada		–		8	–	3	–	0
Central Connecticut		–		7	–	3	–	0
Northern Michigan ^		–		7	–	3	–	0
Youngstown State		–		7	–	3	–	0
Portland State		–		7	–	4	–	0
Delaware		–		6	–	3	–	1
Akron		–		6	–	4	–	1
American International		–		5	–	4	–	1
West Chester		–		5	–	5	–	0
Central State (OH)		–		5	–	6	–	0
Arkansas–Pine Bluff		–		4	–	5	–	1
Bucknell		–		4	–	5	–	0
Southern Connecticut State		–		4	–	6	–	0
Northeastern		–		3	–	6	–	1
Northern Colorado		–		3	–	7	–	0
Santa Clara		–		2	–	7	–	1
Eastern Illinois		–		1	–	10	–	0
^ – NCAA Division II playoff participant; Rankings from Associated Press poll

The 1977 Lehigh Engineers football team represented Lehigh University during the 1977 NCAA Division II football season, and completed the 94th season of Engineers football. The Engineers played their home games at Taylor Stadium in Bethlehem, Pennsylvania. The 1977 team came off a 6–5 record from the previous season. The team was led by coach John Whitehead. The team finished the regular season with a 9–2 record and made the NCAA Division II playoffs. The Engineers defeated the Jacksonville State Gamecocks 33–0 in the National Championship Game en route to the program's first NCAA Division II Football Championship.

== Schedule ==
Date	Opponent	Rank	Site	Result	Attendance	Source
September 10	Connecticut		Taylor Stadium; Bethlehem, PA	W 49–0	9,500	
September 17	at Baldwin–Wallace		George Finnie Stadium; Berea, OH	L 21–14	5,184	
September 24	Penn		Taylor Stadium; Bethlehem, PA	W 19–7	6,000–10,000	
October 1	at Davidson		Richardson Stadium; Davidson, NC	W 43–7	4,600	
October 8	at Rhode Island		Meade Stadium; Kingston, RI	W 42–16	4,115	
October 15	at Rutgers		Rutgers Stadium; Piscataway, NJ	L 0–20	21,000	
October 22	VMI		Taylor Stadium; Bethlehem, PA	W 30–20	13,000	
October 29	Bucknell		Taylor Stadium; Bethlehem, PA	W 47–13	11,000–11,500	
November 5	at Gettysburg		Musselman Stadium; Gettysburg, PA	W 47–0	3,460	
November 12	C.W. Post	No. T–10	Taylor Stadium; Bethlehem, PA	W 36–10	9,500	
November 19	Lafayette	No. 8	Taylor Stadium; Bethlehem, PA (The Rivalry)	W 35–17	18,000	
November 26	at No. 2 UMass	No. 8	Alumni Stadium; Hadley, MA (NCAA Division II Quarterfinal)	W 30–23	5,700	
December 3	at No. 3 UC Davis	No. 8	Toomey Field; Davis, CA (Knute Rockne Bowl—NCAA Division II Semifinal)	W 39–30	10,500	
December 10	vs. No. 9 Jacksonville State	No. 8	Memorial Stadium; Wichita Falls, TX (Pioneer Bowl—NCAA Division II Championship Game)	W 33–0	14,114	
Rankings from Associated Press Poll released prior to the game
