= 1977 Penn Quakers football team =

American college football season

1977 Penn Quakers football
- Conference: Ivy League
- Record: 5–4 (4–3 Ivy)
- Head coach: Harry Gamble (7th season)
- Defensive coordinator: Otto Kneidinger (7th season)
- Captain: Michael Daley
- Home stadium: Franklin Field

1977 Ivy League football standings
	Conf.					Overall
Team	W		L		T	W		L		T
Yale $	6	–	1	–	0	7	–	2	–	0
Brown	5	–	2	–	0	7	–	2	–	0
Harvard	4	–	3	–	0	4	–	5	–	0
Penn	4	–	3	–	0	5	–	4	–	0
Dartmouth	4	–	3	–	0	6	–	3	–	0
Princeton	3	–	4	–	0	3	–	6	–	0
Cornell	1	–	6	–	0	1	–	8	–	0
Columbia	1	–	6	–	0	2	–	7	–	0
$ – Conference champion

The 1977 Penn Quakers football team represented the University of Pennsylvania in the 1977 NCAA Division I football season.

== Schedule ==
Date	Opponent	Site	Result	Attendance	Source
September 17	Cornell	Franklin Field; Philadelphia, PA (rivalry)	W 17–7	15,886	
September 24	at Lehigh*	Taylor Stadium; Bethlehem, PA	L 7–19	6,000–10,000	
October 1	at Columbia	Baker Field; New York, NY	L 18–30	5,135	
October 8	Brown	Franklin Field; Philadelphia, PA	W 14–7	6,327	
October 14	Lafayette*	Franklin Field; Philadelphia, PA	W 42–7	3,353	
October 22	at Yale	Yale Bowl; New Haven, CT	L 21–27	15,000	
October 29	Princeton	Franklin Field; Philadelphia, PA (rivalry)	W 21–10	14,696	
November 5	at Harvard	Harvard Stadium; Boston, MA (rivalry)	L 15–34	15,000	
November 12	Dartmouth	Franklin Field; Philadelphia, PA	W 7–3	14,184	
*Non-conference game
