= 1977 Brown Bears football team =

American college football season

1977 Brown Bears football
- Conference: Ivy League
- Record: 7–2 (5–2 Ivy)
- Head coach: John Anderson (5th season)
- Captains: Louis Cole; B. Hill
- Home stadium: Brown Stadium

1977 Ivy League football standings
	Conf.					Overall
Team	W		L		T	W		L		T
Yale $	6	–	1	–	0	7	–	2	–	0
Brown	5	–	2	–	0	7	–	2	–	0
Harvard	4	–	3	–	0	4	–	5	–	0
Penn	4	–	3	–	0	5	–	4	–	0
Dartmouth	4	–	3	–	0	6	–	3	–	0
Princeton	3	–	4	–	0	3	–	6	–	0
Cornell	1	–	6	–	0	1	–	8	–	0
Columbia	1	–	6	–	0	2	–	7	–	0
$ – Conference champion

The 1977 Brown Bears football team was an American football team that represented Brown University during the 1977 NCAA Division I football season. A year after its first Ivy League championship, Brown dropped to second place.

In their third season under head coach John Anderson, the Bears compiled a 7–2 record and outscored opponents 173 to 96. Louis Cole and B. Hill were the team captains.

The Bears' 5–2 conference record placed second in the Ivy League standings. They outscored Ivy opponents 101 to 73.

Brown played its home games at Brown Stadium in Providence, Rhode Island.

== Schedule ==
Date	Opponent	Site	Result	Attendance	Source
September 17	at Yale	Yale Bowl; New Haven, CT	L 9–10	27,196	
September 24	Rhode Island*	Brown Stadium; Providence, RI (rivalry)	W 28–10	7,400	
October 1	Princeton	Brown Stadium; Providence, RI	W 10–7	8,500	
October 8	at Penn	Franklin Field; Philadelphia, PA	L 7–14	6,327	
October 15	Cornell	Brown Stadium; Providence, RI	W 21–3	9,500	
October 22	at Holy Cross*	Fitton Field; Worcester, MA	W 44–13	14,000	
October 29	Harvard	Brown Stadium; Providence, RI	W 20–15	17,000	
November 5	at Dartmouth	Memorial Field; Hanover, NH	W 13–10	8,100	
November 12	Columbia	Brown Stadium; Providence, RI	W 21–14	8,500	
*Non-conference game
