= 1977 Harvard Crimson football team =

American college football season

1977 Harvard Crimson football
- Conference: Ivy League
- Record: 4–5 (4–3 Ivy)
- Head coach: Joe Restic (7th season)
- Captain: Steven J. Kaseta
- Home stadium: Harvard Stadium

1977 Ivy League football standings
| | Conf. | | | | | Overall |
| Team | W | | L | | T | W | | L | | T |
|---|---|---|---|---|---|---|---|---|---|---|
| Yale $ | 6 | – | 1 | – | 0 | 7 | – | 2 | – | 0 |
| Brown | 5 | – | 2 | – | 0 | 7 | – | 2 | – | 0 |
| Harvard | 4 | – | 3 | – | 0 | 4 | – | 5 | – | 0 |
| Penn | 4 | – | 3 | – | 0 | 5 | – | 4 | – | 0 |
| Dartmouth | 4 | – | 3 | – | 0 | 6 | – | 3 | – | 0 |
| Princeton | 3 | – | 4 | – | 0 | 3 | – | 6 | – | 0 |
| Cornell | 1 | – | 6 | – | 0 | 1 | – | 8 | – | 0 |
| Columbia | 1 | – | 6 | – | 0 | 2 | – | 7 | – | 0 |
$ – Conference champion

The 1977 Harvard Crimson football team was an American football team that represented Harvard University during the 1977 NCAA Division I football season. Harvard tied for third place in the Ivy League.

In their seventh year under head coach Joe Restic, the Crimson compiled a 4–5 record and were outscored 173 to 153. Steven J. Kaseta was the team captain.

Harvard's 4–3 conference record earned a three-way tie for third in the Ivy League standings. The Crimson outscored Ivy opponents 132 to 118.

Harvard played its home games at Harvard Stadium in the Allston neighborhood of Boston, Massachusetts.

== Schedule ==
| Date | Opponent | Site | Result | Attendance | Source |
|---|---|---|---|---|---|
| September 17 | at Columbia | Baker Field; New York, NY | W 21–7 | 7,125 | |
| September 24 | UMass* | Harvard Stadium; Boston, MA | L 0–17 | 9,000–10,116 | |
| October 1 | Colgate* | Harvard Stadium; Boston, MA | L 21–38 | 25,000 | |
| October 8 | at Cornell | Schoellkopf Field; Ithaca, NY | W 17–7 | 8,000 | |
| October 15 | Dartmouth | Harvard Stadium; Boston, MA (rivalry) | W 31–25 | 26,500 | |
| October 22 | Princeton | Harvard Stadium; Boston, MA (rivalry) | L 7–20 | 19,000 | |
| October 29 | at Brown | Brown Stadium; Providence, RI | L 15–20 | 17,000 | |
| November 5 | Penn | Harvard Stadium; Boston, MA (rivalry) | W 34–15 | 15,000 | |
| November 12 | at Yale | Yale Bowl; New Haven, CT (The Game) | L 7–24 | 64,685 | |
*Non-conference game
