= 1977 Columbia Lions football team =

American college football season

1977 Columbia Lions football
- Conference: Ivy League
- Record: 2–7 (1–6 Ivy)
- Head coach: Bill Campbell (4th season)
- Captains: Steve Elliot; Marty Fischer; Jack Gastler; Paul McCormick
- Home stadium: Baker Field

1977 Ivy League football standings
	Conf.					Overall
Team	W		L		T	W		L		T
Yale $	6	–	1	–	0	7	–	2	–	0
Brown	5	–	2	–	0	7	–	2	–	0
Harvard	4	–	3	–	0	4	–	5	–	0
Penn	4	–	3	–	0	5	–	4	–	0
Dartmouth	4	–	3	–	0	6	–	3	–	0
Princeton	3	–	4	–	0	3	–	6	–	0
Cornell	1	–	6	–	0	1	–	8	–	0
Columbia	1	–	6	–	0	2	–	7	–	0
$ – Conference champion

The 1977 Columbia Lions football team was an American football team that represented Columbia University during the 1977 NCAA Division I football season. Columbia tied for last place in the Ivy League.

In their fourth season under head coach Bill Campbell, the Lions compiled a 2–7 record and were outscored 222 to 149. Paul McCormick, Jack Gastler, Marty Fischer and Steve Elliot were the team captains.

The Lions' 1–6 conference record tied for seventh in the Ivy League standings. Columbia was outscored 164 to 92 by Ivy opponents.

Columbia played its home games at Baker Field in Upper Manhattan, in New York City.

== Schedule ==
Date	Opponent	Site	Result	Attendance	Source
September 17	Harvard	Baker Field; New York, NY	L 7–21	7,125	
September 24	Lafayette*	Baker Field; New York, NY	W 21–10	1,500	
October 1	Penn	Baker Field; New York, NY	W 30–18	5,135	
October 8	at Princeton	Palmer Stadium; Princeton, NJ	L 7–28	8,483	
October 15	Yale^{†}	Baker Field; New York, NY	L 20–42	7,220	
October 22	Colgate*	Baker Field; New York, NY	L 36–48	6,710	
October 29	Dartmouth	Baker Field; New York, NY	L 7–14	5,570	
November 5	at Cornell	Schoellkopf Field; Ithaca, NY (rivalry)	L 7–20	5,000	
November 12	at Brown	Brown Stadium; Providence, RI	L 14–21	8,500	
*Non-conference game; ^{†}Homecoming
