= John Whitehead (American football) =

American football coach and college athletics administrator

- Whitehead pictured in Epitome 1980, Lehigh yearbook

Biographical details
- Born: September 7, 1924; Summit Hill, Pennsylvania, U.S.
- Died: January 19, 2002 (aged 77); Fountain Hill, Pennsylvania, U.S.

Coaching career (HC unless noted)
- 1950: Scotland School (PA) (assistant)
- 1954: Stroud Union HS (PA) (assistant)
- 1955–1957: Stroud Union HS (PA)
- 1958–1962: Middletown HS (NY)
- 1963–1966: Carlisle HS (PA)
- 1967–1968: Lehigh (line)
- 1969–1975: Lehigh (OC)
- 1976–1985: Lehigh

Administrative career (AD unless noted)
- 1986–1989: Lehigh

Head coaching record
- Overall: 75–38–2 (college)
- Tournaments: 3–0 (NCAA D-II playoffs); 1–2 (NCAA D-I-AA playoffs)

Accomplishments and honors

Championships
- 1 NCAA Division II (1977)

John Calvin Whitehead (September 7, 1924 – January 19, 2002) was an American football coach and college athletics administrator. He served as the head football coach at Lehigh University from 1976 to 1985, compiling a record of 75–38–2. His 1977 team at Lehigh won the NCAA Division II Championship and his 1979 was the runner-up in the NCAA Division I-AA Championship playoffs. Whitehead joined the coaching staff at Lehigh in 1967, serving as line coach for two seasons before he was promoted to the newly-created position of offensive coordinator prior to the 1969 season.

Whitehead was born on September 7, 1924, in Summit Hill, Pennsylvania. He died on January 20, 2002.

== Head coaching record ==
=== College ===
| Year | Team | Overall | Conference | Standing | Bowl/playoffs |
|---|---|---|---|---|---|
Lehigh Engineers (NCAA Division II independent) (1976–1977)
| 1976 | Lehigh | 6–5 | | | |
| 1977 | Lehigh | 12–2 | | | W NCAA Division II Championship (Pioneer) |
Lehigh Engineers (NCAA Division I-AA independent) (1978–1985)
| 1978 | Lehigh | 8–3 | | | |
| 1979 | Lehigh | 10–3 | | | L NCAA Division I-AA Championship |
| 1980 | Lehigh | 9–1–2 | | | L NCAA Division I-AA Semifinal |
| 1981 | Lehigh | 8–3 | | | |
| 1982 | Lehigh | 4–6 | | | |
| 1983 | Lehigh | 8–3 | | | |
| 1984 | Lehigh | 5–6 | | | |
| 1985 | Lehigh | 5–6 | | | |
| Lehigh: | | 75–38–2 | | | |
| Total: | | 75–38–2 | | | |
