= 1977 UNLV Rebels football team =

American college football season

1977 UNLV Rebels football
- Conference: Independent
- Record: 9–2
- Head coach: Tony Knap (2nd season)
- Home stadium: Las Vegas Silver Bowl

1977 NCAA Division II independents football records
	Conf.			Overall
Team	W	L	T	W		L		T
Illinois College		–		7	–	1	–	0
No. 8 Lehigh ^		–		12	–	2	–	0
UNLV		–		9	–	2	–	0
Kentucky State		–		8	–	2	–	1
No. T–5 Nevada		–		8	–	3	–	0
Central Connecticut		–		7	–	3	–	0
Northern Michigan ^		–		7	–	3	–	0
Youngstown State		–		7	–	3	–	0
Portland State		–		7	–	4	–	0
Delaware		–		6	–	3	–	1
Akron		–		6	–	4	–	1
American International		–		5	–	4	–	1
West Chester		–		5	–	5	–	0
Central State (OH)		–		5	–	6	–	0
Arkansas–Pine Bluff		–		4	–	5	–	1
Bucknell		–		4	–	5	–	0
Southern Connecticut State		–		4	–	6	–	0
Northeastern		–		3	–	6	–	1
Northern Colorado		–		3	–	7	–	0
Santa Clara		–		2	–	7	–	1
Eastern Illinois		–		1	–	10	–	0
^ – NCAA Division II playoff participant; Rankings from Associated Press poll

The 1977 UNLV Rebels football team was an American football team that represented the University of Nevada, Las Vegas as an independent during the 1977 NCAA Division II football season. In their second year under head coach Tony Knap, the team compiled an 9–2 record.

== Schedule ==
Date	Opponent	Site	Result	Attendance	Source
September 10	at Montana	Dornblaser Field; Missoula, MT	W 15–13	6,500	
September 17	Troy State	Las Vegas Silver Bowl; Whitney, NV	W 35–28	13,424	
September 24	at Boise State	Bronco Stadium; Boise, ID	L 14–45	20,575	
October 1	No. 8 Northern Arizona	Las Vegas Silver Bowl; Whitney, NV	W 20–16	13,397–13,497	
October 8	Western Illinois	Las Vegas Silver Bowl; Whitney, NV	W 59–29	11,798	
October 15	Weber State	Las Vegas Silver Bowl; Whitney, NV	W 26–13	13,318–13,918	
October 22	at San Diego State	San Diego Stadium; San Diego, CA	L 7–31	39,109	
October 29	Cal State Fullerton	Las Vegas Silver Bowl; Whitney, NV	W 24–21	11,663	
November 5	at Idaho	Kibbie Dome; Moscow, ID	W 35–14	7,400	
November 12	North Dakota	Las Vegas Silver Bowl; Whitney, NV	W 38–14	17,238	
November 19	at No. T–5 Nevada	Mackay Stadium; Reno, NV (Fremont Cannon)	W 27–12	10,412	
Rankings from AP Poll released prior to the game
