= 1977 Eastern Illinois Panthers football team =

American college football season

1977 Eastern Illinois Panthers football
- Conference: Independent
- Record: 1–10
- Head coach: John Konstantinos (3rd season)
- Home stadium: O'Brien Stadium

1977 NCAA Division II independents football records
	Conf.			Overall
Team	W	L	T	W		L		T
No. 8 Lehigh ^		–		12	–	2	–	0
UNLV		–		9	–	2	–	0
Kentucky State		–		8	–	2	–	1
No. T–5 Nevada		–		8	–	3	–	0
Central Connecticut		–		7	–	3	–	0
Northern Michigan ^		–		7	–	3	–	0
Youngstown State		–		7	–	3	–	0
Portland State		–		7	–	4	–	0
Delaware		–		6	–	3	–	1
Akron		–		6	–	4	–	1
American International		–		5	–	4	–	1
West Chester		–		5	–	5	–	0
Central State (OH)		–		5	–	6	–	0
Arkansas–Pine Bluff		–		4	–	5	–	1
Bucknell		–		4	–	5	–	0
Southern Connecticut State		–		4	–	6	–	0
Northeastern		–		3	–	6	–	1
Northern Colorado		–		3	–	7	–	0
Santa Clara		–		2	–	7	–	1
Eastern Illinois		–		1	–	10	–	0
^ – NCAA Division II playoff participant; Rankings from Associated Press poll

The 1977 Eastern Illinois Panthers football team represented Eastern Illinois University as an independent during the 1977 NCAA Division II football season. The Panthers played their home games at O'Brien Stadium in Charleston, Illinois. Led by third-year head coach John Konstantinos Eastern Illinois compiled a record of 1–10.

== Schedule ==
Date	Opponent	Site	Result	Attendance	Source
September 3	at Illinois State	Hancock Stadium; Normal, IL (rivalry)	L 0–20	10,000	
September 10	Northeast Missouri State	O'Brien Stadium; Charleston, IL	L 7–10	7,000	
September 17	at Northern Iowa	UNI-Dome; Cedar Falls, Iowa	L 21–31	8,100	
September 24	at Central State (OH)	Wilberforce, OH	L 24–25	5,500	
October 1	Western Illinois	O'Brien Stadium; Charleston, IL	L 14–28	7,500	
October 15	at Cameron	Cameron Stadium; Lawton, OK	L 10–31	4,500	
October 22	Wayne State (MI)	O'Brien Stadium; Charleston, IL	L 14–24	7,500	
October 29	Butler	O'Brien Stadium; Charleston, IL	L 13–31	3,200	
November 5	at Youngstown State	Rayen Stadium; Youngstown, OH	L 22–52	2,000	
November 12	at Murray State	Roy Stewart Stadium; Murray, KY	L 7–35	6,500	
November 19	Evansville	O'Brien Stadium; Charleston, IL	W 17–0	300	
