= 1977 Cornell Big Red football team =

American college football season

1977 Cornell Big Red football
- Conference: Ivy League
- Record: 1–8 (1–6 Ivy)
- Head coach: Bob Blackman (1st season)
- Captains: Tony Anzalone; Terry Lee
- Home stadium: Schoellkopf Field

1977 Ivy League football standings
| | Conf. | | | | | Overall |
| Team | W | | L | | T | W | | L | | T |
|---|---|---|---|---|---|---|---|---|---|---|
| Yale $ | 6 | – | 1 | – | 0 | 7 | – | 2 | – | 0 |
| Brown | 5 | – | 2 | – | 0 | 7 | – | 2 | – | 0 |
| Harvard | 4 | – | 3 | – | 0 | 4 | – | 5 | – | 0 |
| Penn | 4 | – | 3 | – | 0 | 5 | – | 4 | – | 0 |
| Dartmouth | 4 | – | 3 | – | 0 | 6 | – | 3 | – | 0 |
| Princeton | 3 | – | 4 | – | 0 | 3 | – | 6 | – | 0 |
| Cornell | 1 | – | 6 | – | 0 | 1 | – | 8 | – | 0 |
| Columbia | 1 | – | 6 | – | 0 | 2 | – | 7 | – | 0 |
$ – Conference champion

The 1977 Cornell Big Red football team was an American football team that represented Cornell University during the 1977 NCAA Division I football season. Cornell tied for last in the Ivy League.

In its first season under head coach Bob Blackman, the team compiled a 1–8 record and was outscored 199 to 86. Tony Anzalone and Terry Lee were the team captains.

Cornell's 1–6 conference record tied for seventh place in the Ivy League standings. The Big Red were outscored 107 to 50 by Ivy opponents.

Cornell played its home games at Schoellkopf Field in Ithaca, New York.

== Schedule ==
| Date | Opponent | Site | Result | Attendance | Source |
|---|---|---|---|---|---|
| September 17 | at Penn | Franklin Field; Philadelphia, PA (rivalry) | L 7–17 | 15,886 | |
| September 24 | Colgate* | Schoellkopf Field; Ithaca, NY (rivalry) | L 22–28 | 6,500 | |
| October 1 | Rutgers* | Schoellkopf Field; Ithaca, NY | L 14–30 | 3,500 | |
| October 8 | Harvard | Schoellkopf Field; Ithaca, NY | L 7–17 | 8,000 | |
| October 15 | at Brown | Brown Stadium; Providence, RI | L 3–21 | 9,500 | |
| October 22 | at Dartmouth | Memorial Field; Hanover, NH (rivalry) | L 13–17 | 15,000 | |
| October 29 | Yale^{†} | Schoellkopf Field; Ithaca, NY | L 0–28 | 13,000 | |
| November 5 | Columbia | Schoellkopf Field; Ithaca, NY (rivalry) | W 20–7 | 5,000 | |
| November 12 | at Princeton | Palmer Stadium; Princeton, NJ | L 0–34 | 8,677 | |
*Non-conference game; ^{†}Homecoming
