= 1977 Colgate Red Raiders football team =

American college football season

1977 Colgate Red Raiders football
- Conference: Independent
- Record: 10–1
- Head coach: Frederick Dunlap (2nd season)
- Captains: Mike Foley; Gary Hartwig
- Home stadium: Andy Kerr Stadium

1977 NCAA Division I independents football records
	Conf.					Overall
Team	W		L		T	W		L		T
No. 1 Notre Dame		–		–		11	–	1	–	0
No. 5 Penn State		–		–		11	–	1	–	0
Colgate		–		–		10	–	1	–	0
North Texas State *		–		–		10	–	1	–	0
No. 16 San Diego State		–		–		10	–	1	–	0
Tennessee State		–		–		8	–	1	–	1
No. 14 Florida State		–		–		10	–	2	–	0
No. 8 Pittsburgh		–		–		9	–	2	–	1
East Carolina		–		–		8	–	3	–	0
Rutgers		–		–		8	–	3	–	0
Army		–		–		7	–	4	–	0
Louisville		–		–		7	–	4	–	1
Boston College		–		–		6	–	5	–	0
Cincinnati		–		–		5	–	4	–	2
Georgia Tech		–		–		6	–	5	–	0
Memphis State		–		–		6	–	5	–	0
Northwestern State		–		–		6	–	5	–	0
Syracuse		–		–		6	–	5	–	0
William & Mary		–		–		6	–	5	–	0
Southern Miss		–		–		6	–	5	–	0
Temple		–		–		5	–	5	–	1
Hawaii		–		–		5	–	6	–	0
Navy		–		–		5	–	6	–	0
West Virginia		–		–		5	–	6	–	0
South Carolina		–		–		5	–	7	–	0
Utah State		–		–		4	–	7	–	0
Villanova		–		–		4	–	7	–	0
Illinois State		–		–		3	–	7	–	1
Virginia Tech		–		–		3	–	7	–	1
Miami (FL)		–		–		3	–	8	–	0
Richmond		–		–		3	–	8	–	0
Tulane		–		–		3	–	8	–	0
Air Force		–		–		2	–	8	–	1
Holy Cross		–		–		2	–	8	–	0
Northeast Louisiana		–		–		2	–	9	–	0
North Texas State (originally 9–2) awarded a forfeit win after Mississippi State was found to be using an ineligible player.; Rankings from AP Poll

The 1977 Colgate Red Raiders football team was an American football team that represented Colgate University as an independent during the 1977 NCAA Division I football season. In its second season under head coach Frederick Dunlap, the team compiled a 10–1 record. Mike Foley and Gary Hartwig were the team captains.

The team played its home games at Andy Kerr Stadium in Hamilton, New York.

== Schedule ==
Date	Opponent	Rank	Site	Result	Attendance	Source
September 10	Rutgers		Andy Kerr Stadium; Hamilton, NY	W 23–0	12,000	
September 17	Lafayette		Andy Kerr Stadium; Hamilton, NY	W 38–12	4,200	
September 24	at Cornell		Schoellkopf Field; Ithaca, NY (rivalry)	W 28–22	6,500	
October 1	at Harvard		Harvard Stadium; Boston, MA	W 38–21	25,000	
October 8	at Holy Cross		Fitton Field; Worcester, MA	W 31–14	10,132	
October 15	at Princeton		Palmer Stadium; Princeton, NJ	W 31–13	14,940	
October 22	at Columbia		Baker Field; New York, NY	W 48–36	6,710	
October 29	at Boston University		Nickerson Field; Boston, MA	W 43–22	6,100–6,180	
November 5	Bucknell		Andy Kerr Stadium; Hamilton, NY	W 49–17	6,500	
November 12	Northeastern	No. 20	Andy Kerr Stadium; Hamilton, NY	W 48–39	6,500	
November 19	at Delaware		Delaware Stadium; Newark, DE	L 3–21	23,029	
Rankings from AP Poll released prior to the game

== Leading players ==
Three trophies were awarded to the Red Raiders' most valuable players in 1977:

- Two players received the Andy Kerr Trophy, awarded to the most valuable offensive player: Bob Relph, quarterback, and Henry White, running back.
- Gary Hartwig, defensive end, received the Hal W. Lahar Trophy, awarded to the most valuable defensive player.

Statistical leaders for the 1977 Red Raiders included:

- Rushing: Henry White, 1,032 yards and 5 touchdowns on 131 attempts
- Passing: Bob Relph, 2,178 yards, 142 completions and 20 touchdowns on 241 attempts
- Receiving: Dick Slenker, 782 yards and 7 touchdowns on 44 receptions
- Total offense: Bob Relph, 2,405 yards (2,178 passing, 227 rushing)
- Scoring: Pat Healy, 74 points from 11 touchdowns and 4 two-point conversions
- All-purpose yards: Henry White, 1,877 yards (1,056 rushing, 448 kickoff returning, 306 receiving, 67 punt returning)
- Tackles: Doug Curtis, 116 total tackles
- Sacks: Gary Hartwig, 6 quarterback sacks
