= 1977 UC Davis Aggies football team =

American college football season

1977 UC Davis Aggies football

FWC champion

NCAA Division II Semifinal—Knute Rockne Bowl, L 30–39 vs. Lehigh
- Conference: Far Western Conference

Ranking
- AP: No. 3 (NCAA Division II)
- Record: 11–1 (5–0 FWC)
- Head coach: Jim Sochor (8th season)
- Home stadium: Toomey Field

1977 Far Western Conference football standings
	Conf.					Overall
Team	W		L		T	W		L		T
No. 3 UC Davis $^	5	–	0	–	0	11	–	1	–	0
Chico State	3	–	1	–	1	6	–	2	–	1
Cal State Hayward	2	–	2	–	1	6	–	3	–	1
San Francisco State	2	–	3	–	0	5	–	5	–	0
Humboldt State	1	–	3	–	1	5	–	4	–	1
Sacramento State	0	–	4	–	1	0	–	10	–	1
$ – Conference champion; ^ – NCAA Division II playoff participant; Rankings from Associated Press poll

The 1977 UC Davis Aggies football team represented the University of California, Davis as a member of the Far Western Conference (FWC) during the 1977 NCAA Division II football season. Led by eighth-year head coach Jim Sochor, UC Davis compiled an overall record of 11–1 with a mark of 5–0 in conference play, winning the FWC title for the seventh consecutive season. 1977 was the eighth consecutive winning season for the Aggies. With the 5–0 conference record, they stretched their conference winning streak to 23 games dating back to the 1973 season. UC Davis advanced to the NCAA Division II Football Championship for the first time, where they defeated Bethune–Cookman quarterfinals before losing to eventual national champion Lehigh in the semifinal Knute Rockne Bowl. UC Davis outscored its opponents 335 to 159 for the season. The Aggies played home games at Toomey Field in Davis, California.

== Schedule ==
Date	Opponent	Rank	Site	Result	Attendance	Source
September 17	at Cal Lutheran*		Mt. Clef Field; Thousand Oaks, CA	W 24–9	2,200	
September 24	Puget Sound*		Toomey Field; Davis, CA	W 16–14	7,500	
October 1	at Cal Poly Pomona*		Kellogg Field; Pomona, CA	W 27–14	2,500	
October 8	at Cal State Hayward		Pioneer Stadium; Hayward, CA	W 6–0	3,000	
October 15	Sacramento State		Toomey Field; Davis, CA (rivalry)	W 28–0	7,900–8,000	
October 22	at Humboldt State		Redwood Bowl; Arcata, CA	W 27–14	6,500	
October 29	at Santa Clara*	No. 8	Buck Shaw Stadium; Santa Clara, CA	W 31–3	6,210	
November 5	San Francisco State	No. 7	Toomey Field; Davis, CA	W 21–7	5,700	
November 12	No. 4 Nevada*	No. 8	Toomey Field; Davis, CA	W 37–21	12,800–13,000	
November 19	Chico State	No. 3	Toomey Field; Davis, CA	W 54–22	9,400–9,500	
November 26	Bethune–Cookman*	No. 3	Toomey Field; Davis, CA (NCAA Division II Quarterfinal)	W 34–16	10,400	
December 3	No. 8 Lehigh*	No. 3	Toomey Field; Davis, CA (Knute Rockne Bowl—NCAA Division II Semifinal)	L 30–39	10,500	
*Non-conference game; Rankings from Associated Press Poll released prior to the game
