= Knute Rockne Bowl =

Knute Rockne Bowl (defunct)
- NCAA College Division II; East Region Championship (1969–1972); NCAA Division II Semifinal (1976–1977)
- Stadium: Atlantic City Convention Hall (1970–1972), campus sites (1969, 1976–1977)
- Location: Atlantic City, New Jersey (1970–1972), campus sites (1969, 1976–1977)
- Operated: 1969–1972, 1976–1977

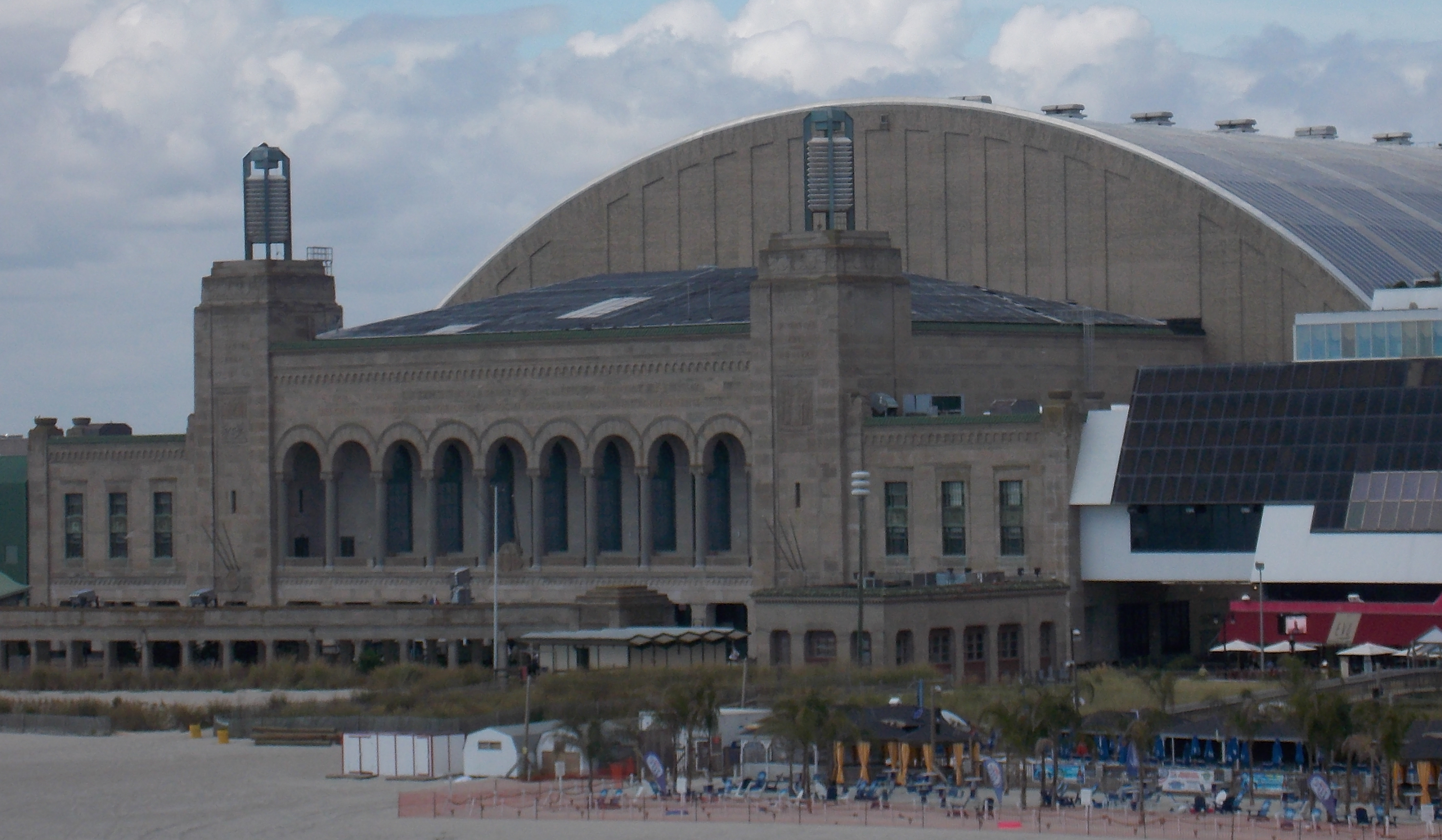
Atlantic City Convention Hall

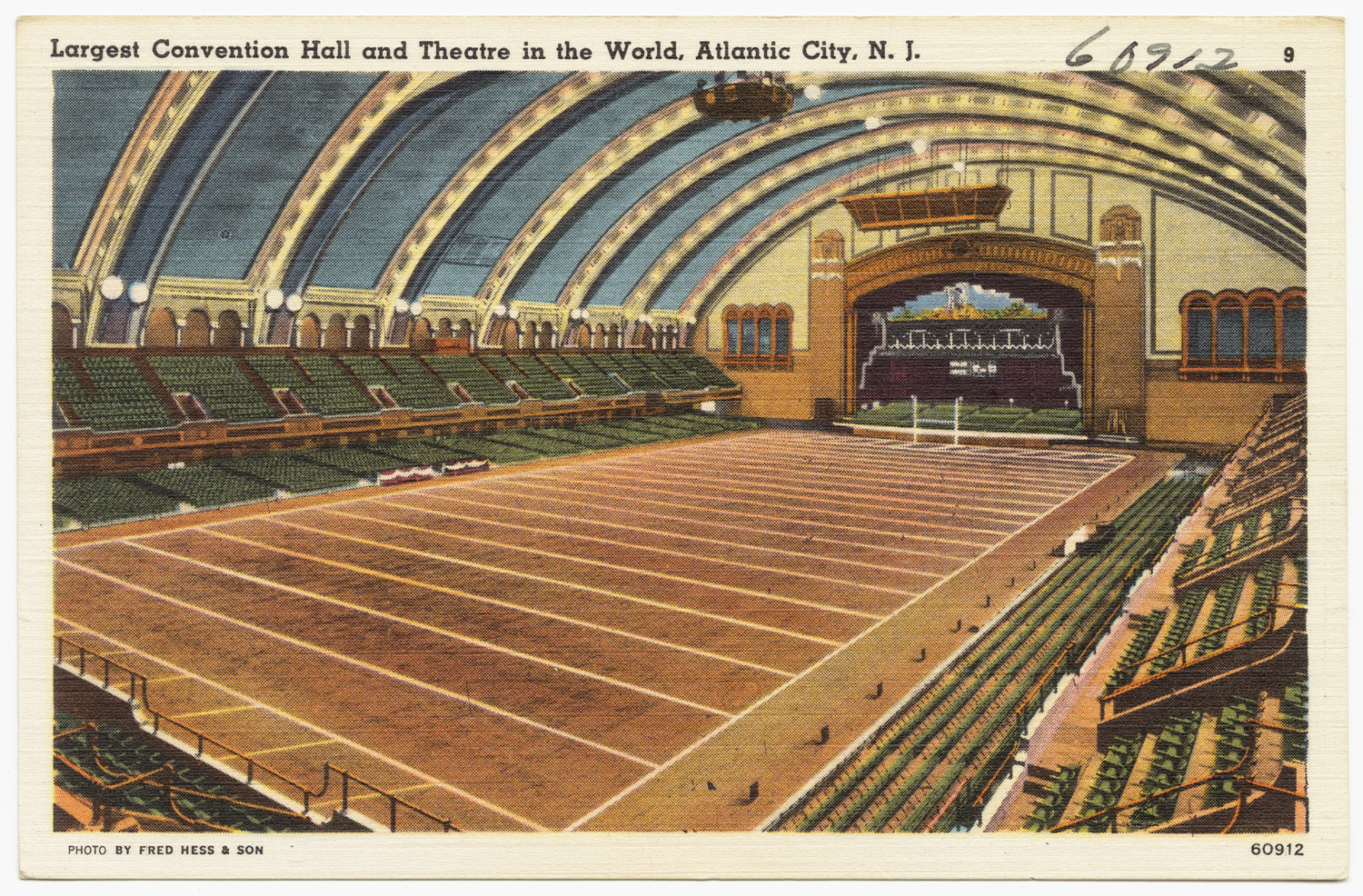
Convention Hall football field, postcard image

The Knute Rockne Bowl (named after football coach Knute Rockne) was an American college football bowl game founded by the NCAA in October 1969. Along with its counterpart, the Amos Alonzo Stagg Bowl, it was "created by the NCAA ... for its College Division II schools, those 100-plus smallest schools in the NCAA." Eligible schools were divided into an East Region (the Northeast and Middle Atlantic states) and West Region (the rest of the country), with the Knute Rockne Bowl serving as the championship of the East Region.

The NCAA thus provided postseason opportunities for schools too small to compete for spots in the four College Division regional bowls it had established in 1964 (as of 1969, these were the Camellia Bowl for the West, the Pecan Bowl for the Midwest, the Grantland Rice Bowl for the Mideast, and the Boardwalk Bowl for the East). At least for the sport of football, this accommodation in 1969 foreshadowed the decision to subdivide the College Division four years later.

When the College Division was subdivided into the current Division II and Division III in 1973, the NCAA made the Amos Alonzo Stagg Bowl the Division III football championship game, and the Knute Rockne Bowl was discontinued. After an absence of three seasons, it was revived as a Division II national semifinal game for 1976 and 1977, alongside the Grantland Rice Bowl. The Knute Rockne Bowl was no longer contested after 1977, when the NCAA stopped attaching "bowl" designations to the Division II semifinals.

The second, third, and fourth Knute Rockne Bowls (1970 through 1972) were held indoors at Convention Hall in Atlantic City, New Jersey, which was also home to the Boardwalk Bowl (1961–1973). In the three seasons that they shared the venue, the games were played two weeks apart. The remaining three Knute Rockne Bowls (1969, 1976, and 1977) were played at the home stadium of one of the participating teams.

== Game Results ==
Date	Winning Team	Score	Losing Team	Score	Location	notes	NCAA playoff
November 29, 1969	Randolph–Macon	47	Bridgeport	28	Bridgeport, Connecticut		College Division II; East Region; Championship
November 28, 1970	Montclair State	7	Hampden–Sydney	6	Atlantic City, New Jersey		College Division II; East Region; Championship
November 26, 1971	Bridgeport	17	Hampden–Sydney	12	Atlantic City, New Jersey		College Division II; East Region; Championship
November 24, 1972	Bridgeport	27	Slippery Rock	22	Atlantic City, New Jersey		College Division II; East Region; Championship
December 4, 1976	Akron	29	Northern Michigan	26	Akron, Ohio		Division II; Semifinal
December 3, 1977	Lehigh	39	UC Davis	30	Davis, California		Division II; Semifinal

== See also ==
- List of college bowl games
- Amos Alonzo Stagg Bowl
- NCAA Division II Football Championship
- NCAA Division III Football Championship
