= 1977 Yale Bulldogs football team =

American college football season

1977 Yale Bulldogs football

Ivy League champion
- Conference: Ivy League
- Record: 7–2 (6–1 Ivy)
- Head coach: Carmen Cozza (13th season)
- Home stadium: Yale Bowl

1977 Ivy League football standings
	Conf.					Overall
Team	W		L		T	W		L		T
Yale $	6	–	1	–	0	7	–	2	–	0
Brown	5	–	2	–	0	7	–	2	–	0
Harvard	4	–	3	–	0	4	–	5	–	0
Penn	4	–	3	–	0	5	–	4	–	0
Dartmouth	4	–	3	–	0	6	–	3	–	0
Princeton	3	–	4	–	0	3	–	6	–	0
Cornell	1	–	6	–	0	1	–	8	–	0
Columbia	1	–	6	–	0	2	–	7	–	0
$ – Conference champion

The 1977 Yale Bulldogs football team represented Yale University in the 1977 NCAA Division I football season. The Bulldogs were led by 13th-year head coach Carmen Cozza, played their home games at the Yale Bowl and finished in first place in the Ivy League with a 6–1 record, 7–2 overall.

== Schedule ==
Date	Opponent	Site	Result	Attendance	Source
September 17	Brown	Yale Bowl; New Haven, CT	W 10–9	27,196	
September 24	Connecticut*	Yale Bowl; New Haven, CT	W 23–12	11,334	
October 1	Miami (OH)*	Yale Bowl; New Haven, CT	L 14–28	19,026	
October 8	Dartmouth	Yale Bowl; New Haven, CT	L 0–3	24,036	
October 15	at Columbia	Baker Field; New York, NY	W 42–20	7,220	
October 22	Penn	Yale Bowl; New Haven, CT	W 27–21	15,000	
October 29	at Cornell	Schoellkopf Field; Ithaca, NY	W 28–0	13,000	
November 5	at Princeton	Palmer Stadium; Princeton, NJ (rivalry)	W 44–8	23,142	
November 12	Harvard	Yale Bowl; New Haven, CT (The Game)	W 24–7	64,685	
*Non-conference game

== Roster ==
1977 Yale Bulldogs football team roster
Players
Coaches
Offense

Pos.	#	Name	Class
FB	38	Rick Angelone	Jr
QB	13	Blake Bennett	So
QB	18	Steve Betz	So
OT	57	A. J. DeCusati	Jr
G	66	Steve Carfora	Sr
RB	22	John Hatem	Jr
RB	42	Kenny Hill	So
WR	88	Kent Kelly	Sr
OT	72	Jim McDonnell	Sr
OT	79	Brian McNamara	Jr
G	64	Mark Noetzel	Jr
RB	15	John Nubani	Sr
QB	14	Pat O'Brien	Jr
RB	40	John Pagliaro	Sr
QB	19	Bob Rizzo	Sr
TE	85	John Spagnola	Jr
G	76	Tim Spears	So
FB	28	Mike Sullivan	So
WR	87	Doug Tennant	Sr
C	58	Tom Ventresca	Sr
RB	30	Bob Wallace	Sr
OT	73	Chuck Zorio	Jr

Defense

Pos.	#	Name	Class
DL	43	Keith Bassi	Sr
DT	71	David Conrad	So
LB	91	Bill Crowley	Jr
DT	70	Paul Denza	Sr
DE	86	Tim Dwyer	So
DE	36	Rich Faschan	Jr
DE	67	Dan Goodfriend	Jr
DB	45	Kevin Gardner	Jr
DT	77	Dave Humphhreville	Sr
DB	20	Chip Kelly	So
LB	13	Jeff Knapp	Sr
DE	41	John Nitti	Fr
DB	11	Kurt Nondorf	Jr
DB	25	Arnie Pinkston	So
DT	68	Mark Stadler	Sr
DE	89	Clint Streit	Jr
DE	80	Mike Tomana	Sr
LB	90	Tim Tumpane	So
DE	29	Charlie Weatherspoon	Sr
DE	92	Pete White	Jr
LB	48	Joe Zuraw	Jr

Special teams

Pos.	#	Name	Class
K	10	Bill Moore	Sr
K	2	David Schwartz	So

Head coach

- Carmen Cozza

Coordinators/assistant coaches

Legend

- (C) Team captain
- (S) Suspended
- (I) Ineligible
- Injured
- Redshirt
