= 1977 Delaware Fightin' Blue Hens football team =

American college football season

1977 Delaware Fightin' Blue Hens football
- Conference: Independent
- Record: 6–3–1
- Head coach: Tubby Raymond (12th season)
- Offensive coordinator: Ted Kempski (10th season)
- Offensive scheme: Delaware Wing-T
- Base defense: 5–2
- Home stadium: Delaware Stadium

1977 NCAA Division II independents football records
| | Conf. | | | Overall |
| Team | W | L | T | W | | L | | T |
|---|---|---|---|---|---|---|---|---|
| No. 8 Lehigh ^ | | – | | 12 | – | 2 | – | 0 |
| UNLV | | – | | 9 | – | 2 | – | 0 |
| Kentucky State | | – | | 8 | – | 2 | – | 1 |
| No. T–5 Nevada | | – | | 8 | – | 3 | – | 0 |
| Central Connecticut | | – | | 7 | – | 3 | – | 0 |
| Northern Michigan ^ | | – | | 7 | – | 3 | – | 0 |
| Youngstown State | | – | | 7 | – | 3 | – | 0 |
| Portland State | | – | | 7 | – | 4 | – | 0 |
| Delaware | | – | | 6 | – | 3 | – | 1 |
| Akron | | – | | 6 | – | 4 | – | 1 |
| American International | | – | | 5 | – | 4 | – | 1 |
| West Chester | | – | | 5 | – | 5 | – | 0 |
| Central State (OH) | | – | | 5 | – | 6 | – | 0 |
| Arkansas–Pine Bluff | | – | | 4 | – | 5 | – | 1 |
| Bucknell | | – | | 4 | – | 5 | – | 0 |
| Southern Connecticut State | | – | | 4 | – | 6 | – | 0 |
| Northeastern | | – | | 3 | – | 6 | – | 1 |
| Northern Colorado | | – | | 3 | – | 7 | – | 0 |
| Santa Clara | | – | | 2 | – | 7 | – | 1 |
| Eastern Illinois | | – | | 1 | – | 10 | – | 0 |
^ – NCAA Division II playoff participant; Rankings from Associated Press poll

The 1977 Delaware Fightin' Blue Hens football team represented the University of Delaware as an independent during the 1977 NCAA Division II football season. They were led by Tubby Raymond, who was in his 12th season as head coach of the Fightin' Blue Hens. The team played its home games at Delaware Stadium in Newark, Delaware. The Hens missed the playoffs, finishing the season with a record of 6–3–1.

== Schedule ==
| Date | Opponent | Site | Result | Attendance | Source |
|---|---|---|---|---|---|
| September 10 | at Eastern Kentucky | Roy Kidd Stadium; Richmond, KY | L 7–24 | 16,500 | |
| September 17 | West Chester | Delaware Stadium; Newark, DE (rivalry) | W 17–15 | 19,497 | |
| September 24 | Morgan State | Delaware Stadium; Newark, DE | T 29–29 | 18,422 | |
| October 1 | Temple | Delaware Stadium; Newark, DE | L 3–6 | 19,677 | |
| October 8 | The Citadel | Delaware Stadium; Newark, DE | W 23–7 | 15,918 | |
| October 15 | at Villanova | Villanova Stadium; Villanova, PA (rivalry) | L 16–33 | 13,800 | |
| October 22 | Middle Tennessee | Delaware Stadium; Newark, DE | W 60–7 | 16,479 | |
| October 29 | Connecticut^{†} | Delaware Stadium; Newark, DE | W 28–0 | 20,206 | |
| November 5 | Davidson | Richardson Stadium; Davidson, NC | W 41–7 | 2,000 | |
| November 19 | Colgate | Delaware Stadium; Newark, DE | W 21–3 | 23,029 | |
^{†}Homecoming

== Roster ==
1977 Delaware Fightin' Blue Hens football team roster
| Players | | | Coaches |
|---|---|---|---|
| Offense: Pos. / # / Name / Class; QB / 14 / Jeff Komlo / Jr | Defense: Pos. / # / Name / Class | Special teams: Pos. / # / Name / Class | Head coach: Tubby Raymond; Coordinators/assistant coaches Legend: (C) Team captain; (S) Suspended; (I) Ineligible; Injured; Redshirt; Roster |
