= 1977 South Carolina State Bulldogs football team =

American college football season

1977 South Carolina State Bulldogs football

Black college national champion MEAC champion

Gold Bowl, W 10–7 vs. Winston-Salem State
- Conference: Mid-Eastern Athletic Conference

Ranking
- AP: No. 4
- Record: 9–1–1 (6–0 MEAC)
- Head coach: Willie Jeffries (5th season)
- Home stadium: State College Stadium

1977 Mid-Eastern Athletic Conference football standings
	Conf.					Overall
Team	W		L		T	W		L		T
No. 4 South Carolina State $	6	–	0	–	0	9	–	1	–	1
North Carolina A&T	5	–	1	–	0	7	–	4	–	0
Delaware State	4	–	2	–	0	7	–	4	–	0
Morgan State	3	–	3	–	0	4	–	6	–	1
Howard	2	–	4	–	0	5	–	5	–	0
Maryland Eastern Shore	1	–	5	–	0	3	–	8	–	0
North Carolina Central	0	–	6	–	0	1	–	10	–	0
$ – Conference champion; Rankings from Associated Press poll

The 1977 South Carolina State Bulldogs football team represented South Carolina State College (now known as South Carolina State University) as a member of the Mid-Eastern Athletic Conference (MEAC) during the 1977 NCAA Division II football season. Led by fifth-year head coach Willie Jeffries, the Bulldogs compiled an overall record of 9–1–1 and a mark of 6–0 in conference play, and finished as MEAC champion. At the conclusion of the season, the Bulldogs were also recognized as black college national champion.

== Schedule ==
Date	Opponent	Rank	Site	Result	Attendance	Source
September 10	Delaware State		State College Stadium; Orangeburg, SC	W 21–0	7,343	
September 17	North Carolina A&T		State College Stadium; Orangeburg, SC	W 52–0	11,823	
September 24	Howard	No. 2	State College Stadium; Orangeburg, SC	W 41–16	5,820	
October 1	at Alcorn State*	No. 2	Henderson Stadium; Lorman, MS	W 31–7	6,000	
October 8	at Johnson C. Smith*	No. 1	American Legion Memorial Stadium; Charlotte, NC	W 47–6	5,000–8,000	
October 15	Morgan State	No. 1	State College Stadium; Orangeburg, SC	W 63–13	5,722	
October 22	at Newberry*	No. 1	Setzler Field; Newberry, SC	T 21–21	7,000	
October 29	at North Carolina Central	No. 2	O'Kelly Stadium; Durham, NC	W 45–12	6,500–7,000	
November 5	Maryland Eastern Shore^{†}	No. 1	State College Stadium; Orangeburg, SC	W 42–7	14,892–15,000	
November 12	Wofford*	No. 1	State College Stadium; Orangeburg, SC	L 21–39	5,242	
December 3	vs. No. T–10 Winston-Salem State*	No. 4	City Stadium; Richmond, VA (Gold Bowl)	W 10–7	14,000	
*Non-conference game; ^{†}Homecoming; Rankings from AP Poll released prior to the game
