= 1977 Nevada Wolf Pack football team =

American college football season

1977 Nevada Wolf Pack football
- Conference: Independent
- Record: 8–3
- Head coach: Chris Ault (2nd season)
- Defensive coordinator: John L. Smith (1st season)
- Home stadium: Mackay Stadium

1977 NCAA Division II independents football records
	Conf.			Overall
Team	W	L	T	W		L		T
No. 8 Lehigh ^		–		12	–	2	–	0
UNLV		–		9	–	2	–	0
Kentucky State		–		8	–	2	–	1
No. T–5 Nevada		–		8	–	3	–	0
Central Connecticut		–		7	–	3	–	0
Northern Michigan ^		–		7	–	3	–	0
Youngstown State		–		7	–	3	–	0
Portland State		–		7	–	4	–	0
Delaware		–		6	–	3	–	1
Akron		–		6	–	4	–	1
American International		–		5	–	4	–	1
West Chester		–		5	–	5	–	0
Central State (OH)		–		5	–	6	–	0
Arkansas–Pine Bluff		–		4	–	5	–	1
Bucknell		–		4	–	5	–	0
Southern Connecticut State		–		4	–	6	–	0
Northeastern		–		3	–	6	–	1
Northern Colorado		–		3	–	7	–	0
Santa Clara		–		2	–	7	–	1
Eastern Illinois		–		1	–	10	–	0
^ – NCAA Division II playoff participant; Rankings from Associated Press poll

The 1977 Nevada Wolf Pack football team represented the University of Nevada, Reno as an independent during the 1977 NCAA Division II football season. Led by secpnd-year head coach Chris Ault, the Wolf Pack compiled a record of 8–3. The team played home games at Mackay Stadium in Reno, Nevada.

== Schedule ==
Date	Opponent	Rank	Site	Result	Attendance	Source
September 10	Westminster (UT)		Mackay Stadium; Reno, NV	W 54–8	7,149	
September 17	Idaho State		Mackay Stadium; Reno, NV	W 35–0	8,100	
September 24	Cal State Northridge	No. T–9	Mackay Stadium; Reno, NV	L 19–22	7,110	
October 1	at San Francisco State		Cox Stadium; San Francisco, CA	W 47–7	3,155	
October 8	at Cal Poly		Mustang Stadium; San Luis Obispo, CA	W 48–29	5,123–5,200	
October 15	No. 3 Boise State^{†}		Mackay Stadium; Reno, NV (rivalry)	W 28–10	11,651	
October 22	at Santa Clara	No. 8	Buck Shaw Stadium; Santa Clara, CA	W 33–14	7,075–7,875	
October 29	Sacramento State	No. 7	Mackay Stadium; Reno, NV	W 75–0	5,840	
November 5	Western Montana	No. 5	Mackay Stadium; Reno, NV	W 49–0	6,140	
November 12	at No. 8 UC Davis	No. 4	Toomey Field; Davis, CA	L 21–37	12,800–13,000	
November 19	UNLV	No. T–5	Mackay Stadium; Reno, NV (Fremont Cannon)	L 12–27	10,412	
^{†}Homecoming; Rankings from Associated Press Poll released prior to the game
