= 1977 Akron Zips football team =

American college football season

1977 Akron Zips football
- Conference: Independent
- Record: 6–4–1
- Head coach: Jim Dennison (5th season)
- Captain: Dave Axner; Steve Cockerham; Charles Parnell
- Home stadium: Rubber Bowl

1977 NCAA Division II independents football records
	Conf.			Overall
Team	W	L	T	W		L		T
Illinois College		–		7	–	1	–	0
No. 8 Lehigh ^		–		12	–	2	–	0
UNLV		–		9	–	2	–	0
Kentucky State		–		8	–	2	–	1
No. T–5 Nevada		–		8	–	3	–	0
Central Connecticut		–		7	–	3	–	0
Northern Michigan ^		–		7	–	3	–	0
Youngstown State		–		7	–	3	–	0
Portland State		–		7	–	4	–	0
Delaware		–		6	–	3	–	1
Akron		–		6	–	4	–	1
American International		–		5	–	4	–	1
West Chester		–		5	–	5	–	0
Central State (OH)		–		5	–	6	–	0
Arkansas–Pine Bluff		–		4	–	5	–	1
Bucknell		–		4	–	5	–	0
Southern Connecticut State		–		4	–	6	–	0
Northeastern		–		3	–	6	–	1
Northern Colorado		–		3	–	7	–	0
Santa Clara		–		2	–	7	–	1
Eastern Illinois		–		1	–	10	–	0
^ – NCAA Division II playoff participant; Rankings from Associated Press poll

The 1977 Akron Zips football team represented Akron University in the 1977 NCAA Division II football season as an independent. Led by fifth-year head coach Jim Dennison, the Zips played their home games at the Rubber Bowl in Akron, Ohio. They finished the season with a record of 6–4–1.

== Schedule ==
Date	Opponent	Rank	Site	Result	Attendance	Source
September 3	at Wayne State (MI)		Wayne State Stadium; Detroit, MI	W 24–14	5,129	
September 10	at Morehead State		Jayne Stadium; Morehead, KY	T 13–13	7,000	
September 17	Western Kentucky		Rubber Bowl; Akron, OH	W 24–3	31,792	
September 24	at No. 7 Northern Michigan	No. 4	Memorial Field; Marquette, MI	L 0–12	4,682	
October 1	Indiana State		Rubber Bowl; Akron, OH	W 20–3	11,678	
October 8	at Dayton	No. 9	Baujan Field; Dayton, OH	W 31–24	9,100	
October 15	Youngstown State	No. 8	Rubber Bowl; Akron, OH (Steel Tire)	L 10–28	8,874	
October 22	at Central Michigan		Perry Shorts Stadium; Mount Pleasant, MI	L 14–17	20,110	
October 29	Eastern Michigan		Rubber Bowl; Akron, OH	L 28–42	6,168	
November 5	Marshall		Rubber Bowl; Akron, OH	W 28–7	6,087	
November 12	Western Illinois		Rubber Bowl; Akron, OH	W 42–7	2,006	
Rankings from AP Poll released prior to the game
