= 1977 NCAA Division II football season =

American college football season

- Regular season: August – November 1977
- Playoffs: November 26 – December 10, 1977
- National Championship: Pioneer Bowl; Memorial Stadium; Wichita Falls, TX
- Champion: Lehigh

The 1977 NCAA Division II football season, part of college football in the United States organized by the National Collegiate Athletic Association at the Division II level, began in August 1977 and concluded with the championship game on December 10 at Memorial Stadium in Wichita Falls, Texas. The Lehigh Engineers defeated the Jacksonville State Gamecocks 33–0 in the Pioneer Bowl to win their first Division II national title.

This was the last season prior to the creation of Division I-AA, now named Division I-Football Championship Subdivision (FCS), which debuted in 1978.

== Conference realignment ==
=== Conference changes ===
- This was the final season at the Division II level for the members of five conferences: the Big Sky Conference, Mid-Eastern Athletic Conference, Ohio Valley Conference, Southwestern Athletic Conference, and Yankee Conference. After the end of play, each conference and its members, alongside seven independent teams, would transition to the newly established Division I-AA level of college football.

=== Membership changes ===
School	1975 Conference	1976 Conference
Tennessee–Chattanooga	D-II Independent	Southern (I-A)

== Conference standings ==
1977 Big Sky Conference football standings
	Conf.					Overall
Team	W		L		T	W		L		T
No. T–5 Boise State $	6	–	0	–	0	9	–	2	–	0
No. T–5 Northern Arizona ^	5	–	1	–	0	9	–	3	–	0
Montana State	3	–	3	–	0	6	–	4	–	0
Weber State	2	–	4	–	0	4	–	6	–	0
Idaho State	2	–	4	–	0	3	–	8	–	0
Idaho	2	–	4	–	0	3	–	8	–	0
Montana	1	–	5	–	0	4	–	6	–	0
$ – Conference champion; ^ – NCAA Division II playoff participant; Boise State concluded its regular season after the NCAA Division II playoffs started; runner-up Northern Arizona was awarded playoff bid.; Rankings from NCAA Division II AP Poll

1977 California Collegiate Athletic Association football standings
	Conf.					Overall
Team	W		L		T	W		L		T
Cal Poly $	2	–	0	–	0	6	–	4	–	0
Cal State Northridge	1	–	1	–	0	7	–	3	–	1
Cal Poly Pomona	0	–	2	–	0	2	–	8	–	0
Cal State Los Angeles	0	–	0	–	0	4	–	5	–	0
$ – Conference champion

1977 Central Intercollegiate Athletic Association football standings
	Conf.					Overall
Team	W		L		T	W		L		T
No. T–10 Winston-Salem State $	8	–	0	–	0	11	–	1	–	0
Virginia Union	7	–	1	–	0	10	–	1	–	0
Virginia State	6	–	1	–	1	7	–	3	–	1
Hampton	5	–	3	–	0	7	–	3	–	0
Norfolk State	4	–	3	–	1	5	–	6	–	1
Livingstone	4	–	4	–	0	4	–	6	–	0
Elizabeth City State	3	–	5	–	0	4	–	6	–	0
Fayetteville State	2	–	6	–	0	3	–	7	–	0
Johnson C. Smith	2	–	6	–	0	3	–	7	–	0
Shaw	1	–	7	–	0	2	–	8	–	0
Saint Paul's (VA)	0	–	8	–	0	1	–	10	–	0
$ – Conference champion; Rankings from NCAA Division II AP Poll

1977 Far Western Conference football standings
	Conf.					Overall
Team	W		L		T	W		L		T
No. 3 UC Davis $^	5	–	0	–	0	11	–	1	–	0
Chico State	3	–	1	–	1	6	–	2	–	1
Cal State Hayward	2	–	2	–	1	6	–	3	–	1
San Francisco State	2	–	3	–	0	5	–	5	–	0
Humboldt State	1	–	3	–	1	5	–	4	–	1
Sacramento State	0	–	4	–	1	0	–	10	–	1
$ – Conference champion; ^ – NCAA Division II playoff participant; Rankings from Associated Press poll

1977 Great Lakes Intercollegiate Athletic Conference football standings
	Conf.					Overall
Team	W		L		T	W		L		T
No. 18 Grand Valley State $	4	–	1	–	0	7	–	3	–	0
Wayne State (MI)	3	–	2	–	0	7	–	4	–	0
Hillsdale	2	–	3	–	0	6	–	4	–	0
Northwood	2	–	3	–	0	5	–	4	–	0
Saginaw Valley State	2	–	3	–	0	6	–	5	–	0
Ferris State	2	–	3	–	0	3	–	7	–	0
$ – Conference champion; Rankings from NAIA Division II poll

1977 Gulf South Conference football standings
	Conf.					Overall
Team	W		L		T	W		L		T
No. 9 Jacksonville State $^	7	–	1	–	0	11	–	3	–	0
Tennessee–Martin	6	–	2	–	0	8	–	3	–	0
Troy State	6	–	2	–	0	6	–	4	–	0
Southeastern Louisiana	5	–	3	–	0	6	–	4	–	0
Mississippi College	4	–	4	–	0	6	–	4	–	0
North Alabama	3	–	5	–	0	5	–	5	–	0
Delta State	3	–	5	–	0	4	–	6	–	0
Nicholls State	2	–	6	–	0	4	–	7	–	0
Livingston	1	–	7	–	0	2	–	8	–	0
$ – Conference champion; ^ – NCAA Division II playoff participant; Jacksonville State's game against Tennessee Tech, Tennessee–Martin's games against Austin Peay and Murray State, Troy State's game against Northern Michigan, Southeastern Louisiana's game against Sam Houston State, Mississippi College's game against Ouachita Baptist, North Alabama's game against Austin Peay, Nicholls State's games against Cameron and Austin Peay, and Livingston's game against Alabama State were designated as conference games and counted in the Gulf South standings.; Rankings from AP Poll

1977 Indiana Collegiate Conference football standings
	Conf.					Overall
Team	W		L		T	W		L		T
Saint Joseph's (IN) +	3	–	1	–	0	5	–	4	–	0
Butler +	3	–	1	–	0	5	–	5	–	0
Indiana Central	2	–	1	–	1	6	–	2	–	1
Valparaiso	1	–	2	–	1	3	–	6	–	1
Evansville	0	–	4	–	0	1	–	8	–	0
+ – Conference co-champions

1977 Mid-Eastern Athletic Conference football standings
	Conf.					Overall
Team	W		L		T	W		L		T
No. 4 South Carolina State $	6	–	0	–	0	9	–	1	–	1
North Carolina A&T	5	–	1	–	0	7	–	4	–	0
Delaware State	4	–	2	–	0	7	–	4	–	0
Morgan State	3	–	3	–	0	4	–	6	–	1
Howard	2	–	4	–	0	5	–	5	–	0
Maryland Eastern Shore	1	–	5	–	0	3	–	8	–	0
North Carolina Central	0	–	6	–	0	1	–	10	–	0
$ – Conference champion; Rankings from Associated Press poll

1977 Missouri Intercollegiate Athletic Association football standings
	Conf.					Overall
Team	W		L		T	W		L		T
SE Missouri State +	4	–	1	–	1	7	–	3	–	1
Missouri-Rolla +	4	–	1	–	1	7	–	3	–	1
NE Missouri State	4	–	2	–	0	8	–	3	–	0
SW Missouri State	3	–	2	–	1	6	–	3	–	1
NW Missouri State	2	–	3	–	1	5	–	5	–	1
Central Missouri State	2	–	4	–	0	3	–	7	–	0
Lincoln (MO)	0	–	6	–	0	1	–	10	–	0
+ – Conference co-champions; ^ – NCAA Division II playoff participant

1977 North Central Conference football standings
	Conf.					Overall
Team	W		L		T	W		L		T
No. 1 North Dakota State $^	6	–	0	–	1	9	–	2	–	1
Augustana (SD)	4	–	3	–	0	7	–	4	–	0
Northern Iowa	4	–	3	–	0	6	–	5	–	0
South Dakota State	3	–	3	–	1	5	–	4	–	1
Nebraska–Omaha *	2	–	2	–	3	3	–	6	–	2
North Dakota	2	–	4	–	1	4	–	7	–	1
South Dakota *	2	–	4	–	1	4	–	7	–	0
Morningside	1	–	5	–	1	2	–	6	–	1
$ – Conference champion; ^ – NCAA Division II playoff participant; * – Nebraska–Omaha and South Dakota split two head-to-head games, which counted as a tie for each team in the conference standings.; Rankings from AP Poll

1977 Northern Intercollegiate Conference football standings
	Conf.					Overall
Team	W		L		T	W		L		T
Minnesota Morris $^	7	–	0	–	0	10	–	2	–	0
Bemidji State	5	–	2	–	0	6	–	4	–	0
Moorhead State	5	–	2	–	0	6	–	4	–	0
Minnesota Duluth	4	–	3	–	0	7	–	3	–	0
St. Cloud State	4	–	3	–	0	5	–	6	–	0
Michigan Tech	1	–	6	–	0	3	–	7	–	0
Winona State	1	–	6	–	0	3	–	7	–	0
Southwest State (MN)	1	–	6	–	0	1	–	8	–	0
$ – Conference champion; ^ – NCAA Division III playoff participant

1977 Ohio Valley Conference football standings
	Conf.					Overall
Team	W		L		T	W		L		T
Austin Peay $	6	–	1	–	0	8	–	3	–	0
Tennessee Tech	5	–	2	–	0	9	–	2	–	0
Eastern Kentucky	4	–	3	–	0	5	–	5	–	0
Murray State	4	–	3	–	0	6	–	5	–	0
Middle Tennessee	3	–	4	–	0	3	–	8	–	0
Morehead State	2	–	4	–	1	2	–	6	–	2
East Tennessee State	2	–	5	–	0	3	–	8	–	0
Western Kentucky	1	–	5	–	1	1	–	8	–	1
$ – Conference champion

1977 Pennsylvania State Athletic Conference football standings
	Conf.					Overall
Team	W		L		T	W		L		T
East Division
No. 4 Millersville xy	5	–	0	–	0	8	–	2	–	0
Kutztown	4	–	1	–	0	7	–	2	–	0
East Stroudsburg	3	–	2	–	0	6	–	2	–	0
Bloomsburg	2	–	3	–	0	4	–	5	–	0
Cheyney	1	–	4	–	0	4	–	5	–	0
Mansfield	0	–	5	–	0	2	–	6	–	1
West Division
No. 8 Clarion xy$	5	–	0	–	1	9	–	0	–	1
Shippensburg	4	–	2	–	0	6	–	4	–	0
Slippery Rock	3	–	2	–	1	4	–	4	–	1
Lock Haven	3	–	3	–	0	5	–	5	–	0
Indiana (PA)	2	–	3	–	1	4	–	4	–	1
Edinboro	2	–	3	–	1	3	–	6	–	1
California (PA)	0	–	6	–	0	2	–	8	–	0
Championship: Clarion 25, Millersville 24
$ – Conference champion; x – Division champion/co-champions; y – Championship game participant; Rankings from NAIA Division I poll

1977 Southern Intercollegiate Athletic Conference football standings
	Conf.					Overall
Team	W		L		T	W		L		T
Division I
Florida A&M x	5	–	0	–	0	11	–	0	–	0
Bethune–Cookman ^	4	–	1	–	0	8	–	4	–	0
Albany State	2	–	3	–	0	7	–	3	–	0
Morris Brown	2	–	3	–	0	5	–	4	–	0
Alabama A&M	1	–	4	–	0	2	–	9	–	0
Tuskegee	1	–	4	–	0	3	–	7	–	0
Division II
Knoxville x	6	–	1	–	0	8	–	3	–	0
Savannah State	3	–	2	–	0	4	–	5	–	0
Clark (GA)	3	–	2	–	0	3	–	5	–	0
Morehouse	3	–	3	–	0	4	–	5	–	0
Lane	2	–	2	–	0	2	–	6	–	0
Fort Valley State	2	–	3	–	0	5	–	5	–	0
Miles	2	–	3	–	0	2	–	8	–	0
Fisk	0	–	5	–	0	0	–	9	–	0
x – Division champion/co-champions; ^ – NCAA Division II playoff participant

1977 Southwestern Athletic Conference football standings
	Conf.					Overall
Team	W		L		T	W		L		T
Grambling State $	6	–	0	–	0	10	–	1	–	0
Jackson State	5	–	1	–	0	8	–	3	–	0
Texas Southern	3	–	2	–	1	6	–	4	–	1
Mississippi Valley State	2	–	4	–	0	5	–	5	–	0
Alcorn State	2	–	4	–	0	3	–	8	–	0
Southern	1	–	4	–	1	3	–	7	–	1
Prairie View A&M	1	–	5	–	0	3	–	8	–	0
$ – Conference champion; The Conference was a hybrid of Division I and II programs. Mississippi Valley State and Prairie View A&M were classified as Division II. All the others were classified as Division I.

1977 West Virginia Intercollegiate Athletic Conference football standings
	Conf.					Overall
Team	W		L		T	W		L		T
Northern Division
No. 9 West Virginia Wesleyan xy	3	–	1	–	0	7	–	3	–	0
Salem x	3	–	1	–	0	7	–	3	–	0
Shepherd x	3	–	1	–	0	6	–	4	–	0
West Liberty State	1	–	3	–	0	3	–	6	–	1
Fairmont State	0	–	4	–	0	4	–	5	–	0
Southern Division
No. 4 Concord xy$^	4	–	0	–	0	9	–	2	–	1
West Virginia Tech	3	–	1	–	0	4	–	5	–	0
West Virginia State	2	–	2	–	0	3	–	8	–	0
Glenville State	1	–	3	–	0	1	–	8	–	0
Bluefield State	0	–	4	–	0	2	–	7	–	0
Championship: Concord 33, West Virginia Wesleyan 17
$ – Conference champion; x – Division champion/co-champions; y – Championship game participant; ^ – NAIA Division II playoff participant Conference standings based on power ratings; Rankings from NAIA Division II poll

1977 Yankee Conference football standings
	Conf.					Overall
Team	W		L		T	W		L		T
No. 2 UMass $	5	–	0	–	0	8	–	3	–	0
Rhode Island	4	–	1	–	0	6	–	5	–	0
New Hampshire	3	–	2	–	0	8	–	2	–	0
Boston University	1	–	4	–	0	3	–	7	–	0
Maine	1	–	4	–	0	3	–	7	–	0
Connecticut	1	–	4	–	0	1	–	10	–	0
$ – Conference champion; Rankings from Associated Press poll

1977 NCAA Division II independents football records
	Conf.			Overall
Team	W	L	T	W		L		T
No. 8 Lehigh ^		–		12	–	2	–	0
UNLV		–		9	–	2	–	0
Kentucky State		–		8	–	2	–	1
No. T–5 Nevada		–		8	–	3	–	0
Central Connecticut		–		7	–	3	–	0
Northern Michigan ^		–		7	–	3	–	0
Youngstown State		–		7	–	3	–	0
Portland State		–		7	–	4	–	0
Delaware		–		6	–	3	–	1
Akron		–		6	–	4	–	1
American International		–		5	–	4	–	1
West Chester		–		5	–	5	–	0
Central State (OH)		–		5	–	6	–	0
Arkansas–Pine Bluff		–		4	–	5	–	1
Bucknell		–		4	–	5	–	0
Southern Connecticut State		–		4	–	6	–	0
Northeastern		–		3	–	6	–	1
Northern Colorado		–		3	–	7	–	0
Santa Clara		–		2	–	7	–	1
Eastern Illinois		–		1	–	10	–	0
^ – NCAA Division II playoff participant; Rankings from Associated Press poll

== Conference summaries ==
Conference Champions

Big Sky Conference – Boise State
Central Intercollegiate Athletic Association – Winston-Salem State
Far Western Football Conference – UC Davis
Great Lakes Intercollegiate Athletic Conference – Grand Valley State
Gulf South Conference – Jacksonville State
Indiana Collegiate Conference – St. Joseph's and Butler
Lone Star Conference – Abilene Christian and Texas A&I
Missouri Intercollegiate Athletic Association – Missouri–Rolla and Southeast Missouri State
North Central Conference – North Dakota State
Northern Intercollegiate Conference – Minnesota–Morris
Pennsylvania State Athletic Conference – Clarion
Rocky Mountain Athletic Conference – Western State (CO)
South Atlantic Conference – Elon
Southern Intercollegiate Athletic Conference (Division II) – Florida A&M
Yankee Conference – UMass

== Postseason ==
1977 NCAA Division II Football Championship
- Teams: 8
- Finals Site: Memorial Stadium; Wichita Falls, TX
- Champion: Lehigh; (1st title, 1st title game)
- Runner-up: Jacksonville State; (1st title game)
- Semifinalists: UC Davis; North Dakota State
- Winning coach: John Whitehead; 1st championship

The 1977 NCAA Division II Football Championship playoffs were the fifth single-elimination tournament to determine the national champion of Division II college football. The championship game was held at Memorial Stadium in Wichita Falls, Texas for the second time.

=== Playoff bracket ===
First round Campus sites November 26
UC Davis*	34
Bethune–Cookman	16
Lehigh	30
UMass*	23
North Dakota State*	20
Northern Michigan	6
Jacksonville State	35
Northern Arizona*	0

Semifinals; Campus sites Knute Rockne Bowl; Grantland Rice Bowl; December 3
UC Davis*	30
Lehigh	39
North Dakota State	7
Jacksonville State*	31

Championship; Pioneer Bowl; Memorial Stadium; Wichita Falls, TX; December 10
Lehigh	33
Jacksonville State	0

* Denotes host institution

- Northern Arizona was the Big Sky runner-up; champion Boise State had a scheduling conflict.

== See also ==
- 1977 NCAA Division I football season
- 1977 NCAA Division III football season
- 1977 NAIA Division I football season
- 1977 NAIA Division II football season
