= 1977 NCAA Division II football rankings =

The 1977 NCAA Division II football rankings are from the Associated Press. This is for the 1977 season.

== Legend ==
| | Increase in ranking |
| | Decrease in ranking |
| | Not ranked previous week |
| (#–#) | Win–loss record |
| (Italics) | Number of first place votes |
| т | Tied with team above or below also with this symbol |

== Associated Press poll ==
| | Week 1 Sept 21 | Week 2 Sept 28 | Week 3 Oct 5 | Week 4 Oct 12 | Week 5 Oct 19 | Week 6 Oct 26 | Week 7 Nov 2 | Week 8 Nov 9 | Week 9 Nov 16 | |
|---|---|---|---|---|---|---|---|---|---|---|
| 1. | Montana State (2–0) | Montana State (3–0) | South Carolina State (4–0) | South Carolina State (5–0) | South Carolina State (6–0) | New Hampshire (7–0) | South Carolina State (7–0–1) | South Carolina State (8–0–1) | North Dakota State (8–1–1) | 1. |
| 2. | South Carolina State (2–0) | South Carolina State (3–0) | New Hampshire (4–0) | New Hampshire (5–0) | New Hampshire (6–0) | South Carolina State (6–0–1) | North Dakota State (6–1–1) | North Dakota State (7–1–1) | UMass (8–1) | 2. |
| 3. | New Hampshire (2–0) | New Hampshire (3–0) | Jacksonville State (5–0) | Boise State (4–1) | Montana State (5–1) | Northern Michigan (7–1) | UMass (6–1) т | UMass (7–1) | UC Davis (9–0) | 3. |
| 4. | Akron (2–0–1) | Jacksonville State (4–0) | Boise State (3–1) | Montana State (4–1) | Northern Michigan (6–1) | North Dakota State (5–1–1) | Tennessee Tech (8–0) т | Nevada (8–1) | South Carolina State (8–1–1) | 4. |
| 5. | Jacksonville State (3–0) | North Dakota State (2–1–1) | Montana State (3–1) | Northern Michigan (5–1) | North Dakota State (4–1–1) | UMass (6–1) | Nevada (7–1) | New Hampshire (8–1) | Boise State (8–2) т | 5. |
| 6. | North Dakota State (1–1–1) | Northern Michigan (3–1) | North Dakota State (3–1–1) | North Dakota State (3–1–1) | UMass (5–1) | Tennessee Tech (7–0) | New Hampshire (7–1) | Boise State (7–2) | Northern Arizona (8–2) т | 6. |
| 7. | Northern Michigan (2–1) | Tennessee Tech (3–0) | Northern Michigan (4–1) | UMass (4–1) | Tennessee Tech (6–0) | Nevada (6–1) | UC Davis (7–0) | Tennessee Tech (8–1) | Nevada (8–2) т | 7. |
| 8. | Florida A&M (2–0) | Northern Arizona | UMass (3–1) | Akron (4–1–1) т | Nevada (5–1) | UC Davis (6–0) т (Note: In the actual printed polls, UC Davis was listed as California Davis) | Boise State (6–2) | UC Davis (8–0) | Lehigh (8–2) | 8. |
| 9. | Nevada (2–0) т | North Alabama (3–0) | Akron (3–1–1) | Tennessee Tech (5–0) т | Jacksonville State (5–1) | Winston–Salem State (8–0) т | Troy State (6–2) | Northern Michigan (7–2) | Jacksonville State (8–2) | 9. |
| 10. | Tennessee Tech (2–0) т | UMass (2–1) (Note: In the actual printed polls, UMass was listed as Massachusetts) | North Alabama (4–0) т | Jacksonville State (5–1) т | Austin Peay (5–1) т | Bethune–Cookman (6–1) т | Winston–Salem State (9–0) | Winston–Salem State (10–0) т | Winston–Salem State (8–2) т | 10. |
| 11. | | | Tennessee Tech (4–0) т | North Alabama (5–0) т | Winston–Salem State (7–0) т | Northeast Missouri State (6–1) т | | Northern Arizona (7–2) т | Northern Michigan (7–2) т | 11. |
| 12. | | | | | | | | Lehigh (7–2) т | New Hampshire (8–2) т | 12. |
| | Week 1 Sept 21 | Week 2 Sept 28 | Week 3 Oct 5 | Week 4 Oct 12 | Week 5 Oct 19 | Week 6 Oct 26 | Week 7 Nov 2 | Week 8 Nov 9 | Week 9 Nov 16 | |
| | | Dropped: 4 Akron; 8 Florida A&M; 9 Nevada | Dropped: 8 Northern Arizona | None | Dropped: 3 Boise State; 8 Akron; 10 North Alabama | Dropped: 3 Montana State; 9 Jacksonville State; 10 Austin Peay | Dropped: 3 Northern Michigan; 10 Bethune–Cookman; 10 Northeast Missouri State | Dropped: 9 Troy State | Dropped: 7 Tennessee Tech | |
