= 1977 Wake Forest Demon Deacons football team =

American college football season

1977 Wake Forest Demon Deacons football
- Conference: Atlantic Coast Conference
- Record: 1–10 (0–6 ACC)
- Head coach: Chuck Mills (5th season)
- Captains: Don Cervi; Mike McGlamry; Larry Tearry
- Home stadium: Groves Stadium

1977 Atlantic Coast Conference football standings
	Conf.					Overall
Team	W		L		T	W		L		T
No. 17 North Carolina $	5	–	0	–	1	8	–	3	–	1
No. 19 Clemson	4	–	1	–	1	8	–	3	–	1
NC State	4	–	2	–	0	8	–	4	–	0
Maryland	4	–	2	–	0	8	–	4	–	0
Duke	2	–	4	–	0	5	–	6	–	0
Virginia	1	–	5	–	0	1	–	9	–	1
Wake Forest	0	–	6	–	0	1	–	10	–	0
$ – Conference champion; Rankings from AP Poll

The 1977 Wake Forest Demon Deacons football team was an American football team that represented Wake Forest University during the 1977 NCAA Division I football season. In their fifth and final season under head coach Chuck Mills, the Demon Deacons compiled a 1–10 record and finished in last place in the Atlantic Coast Conference.

== Schedule ==
Date	Opponent	Site	Result	Attendance	Source
September 10	Furman*	Groves Stadium; Winston-Salem, NC	W 24–13	20,200	
September 17	Vanderbilt*	Groves Stadium; Winston-Salem, NC	L 0–3	24,250	
September 24	at NC State	Carter Stadium; Raleigh, NC (rivalry)	L 14–41	45,500	
October 1	at Purdue*	Ross–Ade Stadium; West Lafayette, IN	L 17–26	54,060	
October 8	at North Carolina	Kenan Memorial Stadium; Chapel Hill, NC (rivalry)	L 3–24	48,000	
October 15	Maryland	Groves Stadium; Winston-Salem, NC	L 7–35	24,900	
October 22	at Virginia	Scott Stadium; Charlottesville, VA	L 10–12	21,500	
October 29	at No. 16 Clemson	Memorial Stadium; Clemson, SC	L 0–26	40,445–40,600	
November 5	Duke	Groves Stadium; Winston-Salem, NC (rivalry)	L 14–38	15,100	
November 12	South Carolina*	Groves Stadium; Winston-Salem, NC	L 14–24	13,150	
November 19	at Virginia Tech*	Lane Stadium; Blacksburg, VA	L 10–28	20,000	
*Non-conference game; Rankings from AP Poll released prior to the game

== Roster ==
1977 Wake Forest Demon Deacons football team roster
Players
Coaches
Offense

Pos.	#	Name	Class
OT	78	Steve Bernardo	So
QB	10	Ken Daly	So
G	65	Tim Davis	Jr
RB	--	Kenny Duckett	So
QB	15	Frank Emma	Fr
RB	35	George Ervin	So
WR	18	Solomon Everett	Sr
G	52	Carmen Frangiosa	Sr
RB	49	Jimmy Hargrove	So
QB	13	Bob Hely	Jr
RB	5	Ronchie Johnson	So
TE	84	Syd Kitson	So
RB	40	James McDougald	So
QB	12	Mike McGlamry	Sr
OT	60	Jackie Robinson	Jr
RB	32	Stan Rolark	Jr
TE	85	Buddy Patterson	Jr
WR	3	Tom Smith	So
C	76	Larry Tearry	Sr
C	59	Steve Truitt	Fr
RB	26	Bob Ventresca	So
TE	82	Steve Young	Sr
WR	45	John Zeglinski	Sr

Defense

Pos.	#	Name	Class
DE	95	Billy Ard	Fr
DL	70	Frank Armstrong	Fr
LB	36	Carlos Bradley	Fr
LB	83	Don Cervi	Sr
DL	68	Dwayne Crayton	Fr
DL	42	Mac Haupt	So
LB	48	Marc Hester	So
DT	99	Bruce Hopkins	Jr
DB	34	Marc Lancaster	Jr
DB	27	Mark Mattiko	Jr
DE	44	C. D. Osborne	Sr
DB	30	James Royster	Jr
DB	22	Dan Smading	Sr
DL	56	Reuben Turner	Jr
DE	86	Steve Vance	So
DB	20	Charlie Viana	Jr
DE	87	Gerry Vick	So
LB	51	Ed Walker	Sr
DT	53	Bob Williams	Sr
DL	94	Mike Wisher	Fr

Special teams

Pos.	#	Name	Class
P	75	Barry Sikes	Jr

Head coach

- Chuck Mills

Coordinators/assistant coaches

Legend

- (C) Team captain
- (S) Suspended
- (I) Ineligible
- Injured
- Redshirt

== Team leaders ==
Category	Team Leader	Att/Cth	Yds
Passing	Mike McGlamrey	133/252	1,532
Rushing	James McDougald	242	987
Receiving	Steve Young	51	483
