= 1977 The Citadel Bulldogs football team =

American college football season

1977 The Citadel Bulldogs football
- Conference: Southern Conference
- Record: 5–6 (3–2 SoCon)
- Head coach: Bobby Ross (5th season)
- Offensive coordinator: Ralph Friedgen (1st season)
- Defensive coordinator: Frank Beamer (1st season)
- Home stadium: Johnson Hagood Stadium

1977 Southern Conference football standings
	Conf.					Overall
Team	W		L		T	W		L		T
Chattanooga +	4	–	1	–	0	9	–	1	–	1
VMI +	4	–	1	–	0	7	–	4	–	0
The Citadel	3	–	2	–	0	5	–	6	–	0
Furman	3	–	2	–	1	4	–	5	–	2
Western Carolina	2	–	2	–	1	6	–	4	–	1
Appalachian State	1	–	4	–	0	2	–	9	–	0
Marshall	0	–	5	–	0	2	–	9	–	0
Davidson	0	–	0	–	0	4	–	6	–	0
+ – Conference co-champions; VMI's games against William & Mary, East Carolina, and Richmond and Marshall's game against Louisville were designated as conference games and counted in the SoCon standings.

The 1977 The Citadel Bulldogs football team represented The Citadel, The Military College of South Carolina in the 1977 NCAA Division I football season. Bobby Ross served as head coach for the fifth season. The Bulldogs played as members of the Southern Conference and played home games at Johnson Hagood Stadium.

== Schedule ==
Date	Opponent	Site	Result	Attendance	Source
September 3	Wofford*	Johnson Hagood Stadium; Charleston, SC (rivalry)	W 7–0	26,930	
September 10	at Navy*	Navy–Marine Corps Memorial Stadium; Annapolis, MD	L 2–21	16,226	
September 17	Western Carolina	Johnson Hagood Stadium; Charleston, SC	W 20–0	15,740	
October 1	Presbyterian*	Johnson Hagood Stadium; Charleston, SC	W 13–7	16,890	
October 8	at Delaware*	Delaware Stadium; Newark, DE	L 7–23	15,918	
October 15	at VMI	Alumni Memorial Field; Lexington, VA (Military Classic of the South)	L 3–19	8,700	
October 22	East Carolina*	Johnson Hagood Stadium; Charleston, SC	L 16–34	13,520	
October 29	at Chattanooga	Chamberlain Field; Chattanooga, TN	L 14–21	8,300	
November 5	William & Mary*	Johnson Hagood Stadium; Charleston, SC	L 13–14	13,420	
November 12	Appalachian State	Johnson Hagood Stadium; Charleston, SC	W 28–20	10,420	
November 19	Furman^{†}	Johnson Hagood Stadium; Charleston, SC (rivalry)	W 10–3		
*Non-conference game; ^{†}Homecoming

== NFL Draft selections ==
Year	Round	Pick	Overall	Name	Team	Position
1977	11	25	304	Brian Ruff	Baltimore Colts	Linebacker
