= 1977 Duke Blue Devils football team =

American college football season

1977 Duke Blue Devils football
- Conference: Atlantic Coast Conference
- Record: 5–6 (2–4 ACC)
- Head coach: Mike McGee (7th season)
- Defensive coordinator: John Gutekunst (2nd season)
- MVP: Mike Dunn
- Captains: Frank DeStefano; Jeff Green
- Home stadium: Wallace Wade Stadium

1977 Atlantic Coast Conference football standings
	Conf.					Overall
Team	W		L		T	W		L		T
No. 17 North Carolina $	5	–	0	–	1	8	–	3	–	1
No. 19 Clemson	4	–	1	–	1	8	–	3	–	1
NC State	4	–	2	–	0	8	–	4	–	0
Maryland	4	–	2	–	0	8	–	4	–	0
Duke	2	–	4	–	0	5	–	6	–	0
Virginia	1	–	5	–	0	1	–	9	–	1
Wake Forest	0	–	6	–	0	1	–	10	–	0
$ – Conference champion; Rankings from AP Poll

The 1977 Duke Blue Devils football team was an American football team that represented Duke University as a member of the Atlantic Coast Conference (ACC) during the 1977 NCAA Division I football season. In their seventh year under head coach Mike McGee, the Blue Devils compiled an overall record of 5–6, with a conference record of 2–4, and finished fifth in the ACC.

== Schedule ==
Date	Opponent	Site	Result	Attendance	Source
September 10	East Carolina*	Wallace Wade Stadium; Durham, NC	L 16–17	38,200	
September 17	at No. 1 Michigan*	Michigan Stadium; Ann Arbor, MI	L 9–21	104,072	
September 24	at Virginia	Scott Stadium; Charlottesville, VA	W 31–7	26,000	
October 1	Navy*	Wallace Wade Stadium; Durham, NC	W 28–16	24,800	
October 8	at South Carolina*	Williams–Brice Stadium; Columbia, SC	W 25–21	49,385	
October 15	Clemson^{†}	Wallace Wade Stadium; Durham, NC	L 11–17	26,500	
October 22	at Maryland	Byrd Stadium; College Park, MD	L 13–31	44,867	
October 29	at Georgia Tech*	Grant Field; Atlanta, GA	W 25–24	47,131	
November 5	at Wake Forest	Groves Stadium; Winston-Salem, NC (rivalry)	W 38–14	15,100	
November 12	NC State	Wallace Wade Stadium; Durham, NC (rivalry)	L 32–37	28,350	
November 19	No. 18 North Carolina	Wallace Wade Stadium; Durham, NC (Victory Bell)	L 3–16	40,078	
*Non-conference game; ^{†}Homecoming; Rankings from AP Poll released prior to the game

== Roster ==
1977 Duke Blue Devils football team roster
Players
Coaches
Offense

Pos.	#	Name	Class
TE	87	Joel Patten	So

Defense

Pos.	#	Name	Class
DB	42	Dan Brooks	Jr
LB	31	Bill King	Jr
DE	44	Derrick Mashore	Jr
LB	3	Carl McGee	Jr
DT	77	Lyman Smith	Sr
DB	14	Rick Sommers	Jr

Special teams

Pos.	#	Name	Class

Head coach

- Mike McGee

Coordinators/assistant coaches

Legend

- (C) Team captain
- (S) Suspended
- (I) Ineligible
- Injured
- Redshirt
