= 1977 Chattanooga Moccasins football team =

American college football season

1977 Chattanooga Moccasins football

SoCon co-champion
- Conference: Southern Conference
- Record: 9–1–1 (4–1 SoCon)
- Head coach: Joe Morrison (5th season)
- Captain: Game captains
- Home stadium: Chamberlain Field

1977 Southern Conference football standings
	Conf.					Overall
Team	W		L		T	W		L		T
Chattanooga +	4	–	1	–	0	9	–	1	–	1
VMI +	4	–	1	–	0	7	–	4	–	0
The Citadel	3	–	2	–	0	5	–	6	–	0
Furman	3	–	2	–	1	4	–	5	–	2
Western Carolina	2	–	2	–	1	6	–	4	–	1
Appalachian State	1	–	4	–	0	2	–	9	–	0
Marshall	0	–	5	–	0	2	–	9	–	0
Davidson	0	–	0	–	0	4	–	6	–	0
+ – Conference co-champions; VMI's games against William & Mary, East Carolina, and Richmond and Marshall's game against Louisville were designated as conference games and counted in the SoCon standings.

The 1977 Chattanooga Moccasins football team represented the University of Tennessee at Chattanooga as a member of the Southern Conference (SoCon) during the 1977 NCAA Division I football season. The Moccasins were led by fifth-year head coach Joe Morrison and played their home games at Charmerlain Field. They compiled an overall record of 9–1–1 with a mark of 4–1 in conference play, sharing the SoCon title with VMI.

== Schedule ==
Date	Opponent	Site	Result	Attendance	Source
September 10	at Western Kentucky*	L. T. Smith Stadium; Bowling Green, KY	W 27–3	16,500	
September 17	at Appalachian State	Conrad Stadium; Boone, NC	W 14–7	12,230	
September 24	Furman	Chamberlain Field; Chattanooga, TN	L 7–17	9,000	
October 1	Middle Tennessee*	Chamberlain Field; Chattanooga, TN	W 38–7	7,100	
October 8	at Western Carolina	Whitmire Stadium; Cullowhee, NC	W 21–10	1,100	
October 15	Illinois State*^{†}	Chamberlain Field; Chattanooga, TN	W 31–28		
October 22	Jacksonville State*	Paul Snow Stadium; Jacksonville, AL	W 18–14	8,500	
October 29	The Citadel	Chamberlain Field; Chattanooga, TN	W 21–14	8,300	
November 5	at Bowling Green*	Doyt Perry Stadium; Bowling Green, OH	W 37–33		
November 12	Tennessee State*	Chamberlain Field; Chattanooga, TN	T 14–14		
November 19	Marshall	Chamberlain Field; Chattanooga, TN	W 37–20		
*Non-conference game; ^{†}Homecoming
