= 1977 Davidson Wildcats football team =

American college football season

1977 Davidson Wildcats football
- Conference: Southern Conference
- Record: 4–6 (0–0 SoCon)
- Head coach: Ed Farrell (4th season)
- Home stadium: Richardson Stadium

1977 Southern Conference football standings
	Conf.					Overall
Team	W		L		T	W		L		T
Chattanooga +	4	–	1	–	0	9	–	1	–	1
VMI +	4	–	1	–	0	7	–	4	–	0
The Citadel	3	–	2	–	0	5	–	6	–	0
Furman	3	–	2	–	1	4	–	5	–	2
Western Carolina	2	–	2	–	1	6	–	4	–	1
Appalachian State	1	–	4	–	0	2	–	9	–	0
Marshall	0	–	5	–	0	2	–	9	–	0
Davidson	0	–	0	–	0	4	–	6	–	0
+ – Conference co-champions; VMI's games against William & Mary, East Carolina, and Richmond and Marshall's game against Louisville were designated as conference games and counted in the SoCon standings.

The 1977 Davidson Wildcats football team represented Davidson College as a member of the Southern Conference during the 1977 NCAA Division II football season. Led by fourth-year head coach Ed Farrell, the Wildcats compiled an overall record of 4–6.

== Schedule ==
Date	Opponent	Site	Result	Attendance	Source
September 10	at Fordham*	Coffey Field; Bronx, NY	W 20–17		
September 17	Washington and Lee*	Richardson Stadium; Davidson, NC	W 42–14		
September 24	at Bucknell*	Memorial Stadium; Lewisburg, PA	L 12–44	2,500	
October 1	Lehigh	Richardson Stadium; Davidson, NC	L 7–43	4,600	
October 8	Randolph–Macon*^{†}	Richardson Stadium; Davidson, NC	W 49–7		
October 15	at Guilford*	Greensboro, NC	W 31–0	1,200	
October 22	Lenoir–Rhyne*	Richardson Stadium; Davidson, NC	L 20–24	3,500	
October 29	at VMI*	Alumni Memorial Field; Lexington, VA	L 0–21	4,700	
November 5	Delaware*	Richardson Stadium; Davidson, NC	L 7–41	2,000	
November 12	at Lafayette*	Fisher Stadium; Easton, PA	L 18–20	2,500	
*Non-conference game; ^{†}Homecoming
