= 1977 North Carolina Tar Heels football team =

American college football season

1977 North Carolina Tar Heels football

ACC champion

Liberty Bowl, L 17–21 vs. Nebraska
- Conference: Atlantic Coast Conference

Ranking
- Coaches: No. 14
- AP: No. 17
- Record: 8–3–1 (5–0–1 ACC)
- Head coach: Bill Dooley (11th season)
- Defensive coordinator: Jim Dickey (3rd season)
- Captains: Alan Caldwell; Dee Hardison
- Home stadium: Kenan Memorial Stadium

1977 Atlantic Coast Conference football standings
| | Conf. | | | | | Overall |
| Team | W | | L | | T | W | | L | | T |
|---|---|---|---|---|---|---|---|---|---|---|
| No. 17 North Carolina $ | 5 | – | 0 | – | 1 | 8 | – | 3 | – | 1 |
| No. 19 Clemson | 4 | – | 1 | – | 1 | 8 | – | 3 | – | 1 |
| NC State | 4 | – | 2 | – | 0 | 8 | – | 4 | – | 0 |
| Maryland | 4 | – | 2 | – | 0 | 8 | – | 4 | – | 0 |
| Duke | 2 | – | 4 | – | 0 | 5 | – | 6 | – | 0 |
| Virginia | 1 | – | 5 | – | 0 | 1 | – | 9 | – | 1 |
| Wake Forest | 0 | – | 6 | – | 0 | 1 | – | 10 | – | 0 |
$ – Conference champion; Rankings from AP Poll

The 1977 North Carolina Tar Heels football team represented the North Carolina Tar Heels of University of North Carolina at Chapel Hill during the 1977 NCAA Division I football season.

== Schedule ==
| Date | Time | Opponent | Rank | Site | Result | Attendance | Source |
|---|---|---|---|---|---|---|---|
| September 10 | 1:30 p.m. | at Kentucky* | | Commonwealth Stadium; Lexington, KY | L 7–10 | 57,796 | |
| September 17 | 1:30 p.m. | Richmond* | | Kenan Memorial Stadium; Chapel Hill, NC | W 31–0 | 47,100 | |
| September 24 | 1:30 p.m. | at Northwestern* | | Dyche Stadium; Evanston, IL | W 41–7 | 19,597 | |
| October 1 | 1:30 p.m. | No. 13 Texas Tech* | | Kenan Memorial Stadium; Chapel Hill, NC | L 7–10 | 48,000 | |
| October 8 | 1:30 p.m. | Wake Forest | | Kenan Memorial Stadium; Chapel Hill, NC (rivalry) | W 24–3 | 48,000 | |
| October 15 | 1:30 p.m. | at NC State | | Carter Stadium; Raleigh, NC (rivalry) | W 27–14 | 51,300 | |
| October 22 | 1:30 p.m. | South Carolina* | | Kenan Memorial Stadium; Chapel Hill, NC (rivalry) | W 17–0 | 48,250 | |
| October 29 | 1:30 p.m. | at Maryland | | Byrd Stadium; College Park, MD | W 16–7 | 42,683 | |
| November 5 | 1:30 p.m. | No. 13 Clemson | | Kenan Memorial Stadium; Chapel Hill, NC | T 13–13 | 50,500 | |
| November 12 | 1:30 p.m. | at Virginia | No. 19 | Scott Stadium; Charlottesville, VA (South's Oldest Rivalry) | W 35–14 | 21,000 | |
| November 19 | 1:30 p.m. | at Duke | No. 18 | Wallace Wade Stadium; Durham, NC (Victory Bell) | W 16–3 | 40,078 | |
| December 19 | 9:00 p.m. | vs. No. 12 Nebraska* | No. 14 | Liberty Bowl Memorial Stadium; Memphis, TN (Liberty Bowl) | L 17–21 | 49,456 | |
*Non-conference game; Rankings from AP Poll released prior to the game; All times are in Eastern time

== Roster ==
- RB Amos Lawrence, Fr.
- LB Lawrence Taylor, Fr. (Note: Taylor played mostly on special teams as a freshman.)

== Game summaries ==
=== At Virginia ===
- Amos Lawrence 286 rush yards
