= 1977 Marshall Thundering Herd football team =

American college football season

1977 Marshall Thundering Herd football
- Conference: Southern Conference
- Record: 2–9 (0–5 SoCon)
- Head coach: Frank Ellwood (3rd season)
- Defensive coordinator: Carlin B. Carpenter (3rd season)
- Captains: Bob Coleman; Ken Lawson; Ed McTaggart
- Home stadium: Fairfield Stadium

1977 Southern Conference football standings
	Conf.					Overall
Team	W		L		T	W		L		T
Chattanooga +	4	–	1	–	0	9	–	1	–	1
VMI +	4	–	1	–	0	7	–	4	–	0
The Citadel	3	–	2	–	0	5	–	6	–	0
Furman	3	–	2	–	1	4	–	5	–	2
Western Carolina	2	–	2	–	1	6	–	4	–	1
Appalachian State	1	–	4	–	0	2	–	9	–	0
Marshall	0	–	5	–	0	2	–	9	–	0
Davidson	0	–	0	–	0	4	–	6	–	0
+ – Conference co-champions; VMI's games against William & Mary, East Carolina, and Richmond and Marshall's game against Louisville were designated as conference games and counted in the SoCon standings.

The 1977 Marshall Thundering Herd football team was an American football team that represented Marshall University in the Southern Conference (SoCon) during the 1977 NCAA Division I football season. In their third season under head coach Frank Ellwood, the Thundering Herd compiled an overall record of 2–9 record with a mark of 0–5 in conference play, placing last out of seven eligible teams in the SoCon, and were outscored 389 to 234. Bob Coleman, Ken Lawson, and Ed McTaggart were the team captains. The team played its home games at Fairfield Stadium in Huntington, West Virginia.

== Schedule ==
Date	Opponent	Site	Result	Attendance	Source
September 10	Ohio*	Fairfield Stadium; Huntington, WV (rivalry)	L 27–49	15,981	
September 17	Morehead State*	Fairfield Stadium; Huntington, WV	W 38–26	14,872	
September 24	Toledo^{†}*	Fairfield Stadium; Huntington, WV	W 24–0	16,724	
October 1	at Appalachian State	Conrad Stadium; Boone, NC (rivalry)	L 20–28	10,150	
October 8	at Miami (OH)*	Miami Field; Oxford, OH	L 19–29	10,544	
October 15	at Furman	Sirrine Stadium; Greenville, SC	L 24–42	12,000	
October 22	at Western Michigan*	Waldo Stadium; Kalamazoo, MI	L 29–53	22,600	
October 29	Louisville (Note: Marshall's game against Louisville was designated as a conference game and counted in the SoCon standings.)	Fairfield Stadium; Huntington, WV	L 0–56	10,232	
November 5	at Akron*	Rubber Bowl; Akron, OH	L 7–28	6,087	
November 12	Western Carolina	Fairfield Stadium; Huntington, WV	L 26–41	6,038	
November 19	at Chattanooga	Chamberlain Field; Chattanooga, TN	L 20–37		
*Non-conference game; ^{†}Homecoming
