= 1977 Arkansas Razorbacks football team =

American college football season

1977 Arkansas Razorbacks football

Co-national champion (Rothman (FACT)) Orange Bowl champion

Orange Bowl, W 31–6 vs. Oklahoma
- Conference: Southwest Conference

Ranking
- Coaches: No. 3
- AP: No. 3
- Record: 11–1 (7–1 SWC)
- Head coach: Lou Holtz (1st season)
- Offensive scheme: Veer
- Defensive coordinator: Monte Kiffin (1st season)
- Base defense: 5–2
- Captains: Leotis Harris; Steve Little; Howard Sampson
- Home stadium: Razorback Stadium; War Memorial Stadium

1977 Southwest Conference football standings
| | Conf. | | | | | Overall |
| Team | W | | L | | T | W | | L | | T |
|---|---|---|---|---|---|---|---|---|---|---|
| No. 4 Texas $ | 8 | – | 0 | – | 0 | 11 | – | 1 | – | 0 |
| No. 3 Arkansas | 7 | – | 1 | – | 0 | 11 | – | 1 | – | 0 |
| Texas A&M | 6 | – | 2 | – | 0 | 8 | – | 4 | – | 0 |
| Houston | 4 | – | 4 | – | 0 | 6 | – | 5 | – | 0 |
| Texas Tech | 4 | – | 4 | – | 0 | 7 | – | 5 | – | 0 |
| Baylor | 3 | – | 5 | – | 0 | 5 | – | 6 | – | 0 |
| SMU | 3 | – | 5 | – | 0 | 4 | – | 7 | – | 0 |
| TCU | 1 | – | 7 | – | 0 | 2 | – | 9 | – | 0 |
| Rice | 0 | – | 8 | – | 0 | 1 | – | 10 | – | 0 |
$ – Conference champion; Rankings from AP Poll

The 1977 Arkansas Razorbacks football team represented the University of Arkansas in the Southwest Conference (SWC) during the 1977 NCAA Division I football season. In their first year under head coach Lou Holtz, the Razorbacks compiled an 11–1 record (7–1 against SWC opponents), finished in second place in the SWC, and outscored their opponents by a combined total of 389 to 101. The Razorbacks' only loss was to SWC champion Texas by a 13–9 score. There was controversy during that game, when Arkansas QB Ron Calcagni's facemask was grabbed by a Texas player during a key drive, but the officials did not call the penalty, and Arkansas was forced to settle for a field goal. The team advanced to 1978 Orange Bowl, defeating No. 2 Oklahoma by a 31–6 score. Arkansas was ranked No. 3 in both the final AP poll and the final UPI Coaches Poll.

Offensive guard Leotis Harris and placekicker Steve Little were both consensus first-team picks for the 1977 College Football All-America Team. Little punted 48 times for 2,127 yards, and had the fourth-best average in college football, with 44.3 yards per punt. Little scored an average of 8.5 points per game for the Razorbacks, including 19 field goals (30 attempted) and 37 extra points. This was the eighth-best average per game, and the second-best among kickers. His 1.73 field goals per game was second-best to Paul Marchese of Kent State.

The Razorbacks also had the third-best scoring defense and tied for the fourth-best pass defense. The Hogs, along with the Indiana Hoosiers, gave up only 89.5 yards per game through the air, and the Hogs only surrendered 8.6 points per game. Only North Carolina and Ohio State allowed fewer points in 1977. The Hogs were ranked third by the AP, behind runner-up Alabama and champion Notre Dame. Rothman (FACT), a mathematical rating system in use since 1968 and NCAA-designated major selector, selected Arkansas as co-national champions with Notre Dame and Texas.

== Schedule ==
| Date | Opponent | Rank | Site | TV | Result | Attendance | Source |
|---|---|---|---|---|---|---|---|
| September 10 | New Mexico State* | | War Memorial Stadium; Little Rock, AR | | W 53–10 | 53,167 | |
| September 17 | No. 15 Oklahoma State* | | War Memorial Stadium; Little Rock, AR | | W 28–6 | 54,280 | |
| September 24 | Tulsa* | No. 16 | Razorback Stadium; Fayetteville, AR | | W 37–3 | 43,524 | |
| October 1 | at TCU | No. 12 | Amon G. Carter Stadium; Fort Worth, TX | | W 42–6 | 22,713 | |
| October 15 | No. 2 Texas | No. 8 | Razorback Stadium; Fayetteville, AR (rivalry) | ABC | L 9–13 | 44,296 | |
| October 22 | Houston | No. 9 | War Memorial Stadium; Little Rock, AR | | W 34–0 | 53,924 | |
| October 29 | at Rice | No. 8 | Rice Stadium; Houston, TX | | W 30–7 | 20,000 | |
| November 5 | Baylor | No. 8 | War Memorial Stadium; Little Rock, AR | | W 35–9 | 53,620 | |
| November 12 | at No. 11 Texas A&M | No. 8 | Kyle Field; College Station, TX (rivalry) | | W 26–20 | 54,000 | |
| November 19 | SMU | No. 8 | Razorback Stadium; Fayetteville, AR | | W 47–7 | 43,791 | |
| November 24 | Texas Tech | No. 6 | Jones Stadium; Lubbock, TX (rivalry) | ABC | W 17–14 | 32,856 | |
| January 2, 1978 | vs. No. 2 Oklahoma* | No. 6 | Miami Orange Bowl; Miami, FL (Orange Bowl) | NBC | W 31–6 | 60,987 | |
*Non-conference game; Rankings from AP Poll released prior to the game

== Game summaries ==
=== Orange Bowl ===
| | 1 | 2 | 3 | 4 | Total |
|---|---|---|---|---|---|
| #6 Razorbacks | 14 | 0 | 10 | 7 | 31 |
| #2 Sooners | 0 | 0 | 0 | 6 | 6 |

The 1978 Orange Bowl was played between No. 6 Arkansas and No. 2 Oklahoma. Entering the game, the Hogs were twenty-one point underdogs against the Sooners. Arkansas had three offensive starters suspended for the contest and another injured in bowl practice, which also led fans to believe the Sooners would roll. Roland Sales of Arkansas rushed for 205 yards on 23 carries, setting an Orange Bowl record. Sales would hold the record until Ahman Green carried for 206 yards in 1998, beating Sales by a single yard. He came in relief of star running back Ben Cowins, who the Hogs left in Fayetteville for a violation of team rules. Sales began the scoring on a one-yard run after a Billy Sims fumble. Hog QB Ron Calcagni would score next, after a fumble by Oklahoma fullback Kenny King. Steve Little completed a field goal to give the Hogs a 17–0 cushion in the third quarter. Sales scored on a four-yard run to stretch the Hog advantage to 24–0. Oklahoma would score on an eight-yard touchdown pass, but the Hogs would stop the two-point conversion. Barnabas White would tack on another Razorback touchdown, getting the ball from Mike Scott playing quarterback for the Hogs.

Scoring summary

| Quarter | Time | Drive | | | Team | Scoring information | Score | |
| Quarter | Time | Plays | Yards | TOP | Team | Scoring information | ARK | OU |
|---|---|---|---|---|---|---|---|---|
| 1 | 13:01 | | 9 | 2 | ARK | Roland Sales 1-yard touchdown run, Steve Little kick good | 7 | 0 |
| 1 | | | 58 | 7 | ARK | Ron Calcagni 1-yard touchdown run, Steve Little kick good | 14 | 0 |
| 3 | | | 66 | 11 | ARK | 32-yard field goal by Steve Little | 17 | 0 |
| 3 | 4:04 | | 82 | 7 | ARK | Roland Sales 4-yard touchdown run, Steve Little kick good | 24 | 0 |
| 4 | | | 95 | 10 | OU | Hicks 8-yard touchdown reception from Dean Blevins, 2-point run failed | 24 | 6 |
| 4 | | | 70 | 9 | ARK | Ben White 20-yard touchdown run, Steve Little kick good | 31 | 6 |
| "TOP" = time of possession. For other American football terms, see Glossary of American football. | | | | | | | 31 | 6 |

== Personnel ==
=== Coaching staff ===
| Name | Position | Arkansas Years | Alma mater |
|---|---|---|---|
| Lou Holtz | Head coach | 1st | Kent State (1957) |
| Don Breaux | Quarterbacks coach | 1st | McNeese State (1962) |
| Jesse Branch | Wide receivers coach | 1st | Arkansas (1962) |
| Larry Beightol | Offensive line coach | 1st | Catawba College (1963) |
| Monte Kiffin | Defensive coordinator | 1st | Nebraska (1963) |
| John Mitchell | Defensive ends coach | 1st | Alabama (1972) |
| Bob Cope | Defensive backs coach | 1st | Carson–Newman (c. 1960) |
| Pete Carroll | Graduate assistant | 1st | Pacific (1972) |

=== Roster ===
1977 Arkansas Razorbacks football team roster
Players
Coaches
Offense

| Pos. | # | Name | Class |
|---|---|---|---|
| RB | 43 | Jerry Eckwood | Jr |
| G | 72 | Leotis Harris | Sr |
| QB | 10 | Mike Scott | Jr |

Defense

| Pos. | # | Name | Class |
|---|---|---|---|
| DT | 86 | Dan Hampton | Jr |
| S | 31 | Howard Sampson | Sr |

Special teams

| Pos. | # | Name | Class |
|---|---|---|---|
| P, K | 12 | Steve Little | So |

Head coach

- Lou Holtz

Coordinators/assistant coaches

Legend

- (C) Team captain
- (S) Suspended
- (I) Ineligible
- Injured
- Redshirt
