= 1977 Western Carolina Catamounts football team =

American college football season

1977 Western Carolina Catamounts football
- Conference: Southern Conference
- Record: 6–4–1 (2–2–1 SoCon)
- Head coach: Bob Waters (9th season)
- Home stadium: E. J. Whitmire Stadium

1977 Southern Conference football standings
	Conf.					Overall
Team	W		L		T	W		L		T
Chattanooga +	4	–	1	–	0	9	–	1	–	1
VMI +	4	–	1	–	0	7	–	4	–	0
The Citadel	3	–	2	–	0	5	–	6	–	0
Furman	3	–	2	–	1	4	–	5	–	2
Western Carolina	2	–	2	–	1	6	–	4	–	1
Appalachian State	1	–	4	–	0	2	–	9	–	0
Marshall	0	–	5	–	0	2	–	9	–	0
Davidson	0	–	0	–	0	4	–	6	–	0
+ – Conference co-champions; VMI's games against William & Mary, East Carolina, and Richmond and Marshall's game against Louisville were designated as conference games and counted in the SoCon standings.

The 1977 Western Carolina Catamounts team represented Western Carolina University as a member of the Southern Conference (SoCon) during the 1977 NCAA Division I football season. The Catamounts were led by ninth-year head coach Bob Waters and played their home games at E. J. Whitmire Stadium in Cullowhee, North Carolina. The finished the season with an overall record of 6–4–1 and a mark of 2–2–1 in conference play, placing fifth in the SoCon.

== Schedule ==
Date	Opponent	Site	Result	Attendance	Source
September 3	at Jacksonville State*	Paul Snow Stadium; Jacksonville, AL	L 16–21	8,200	
September 10	Tennessee Tech*	E. J. Whitmire Stadium; Cullowhee, NC	L 21–41		
September 17	at The Citadel	Johnson Hagood Stadium; Charleston, SC	L 0–20	15,740	
September 24	at Indiana State*	Memorial Stadium; Terre Haute, IN	W 15–14		
October 1	at Furman	Sirrine Stadium; Greenville, SC	T 24–24	10,000	
October 8	Chattanooga	E. J. Whitmire Stadium; Cullowhee, NC	L 10–21	1,100	
October 15	East Tennessee State*	E. J. Whitmire Stadium; Cullowhee, NC	W 35–0		
October 22	Maine*	E. J. Whitmire Stadium; Cullowhee, NC	W 41–20	6,500	
October 29	Wofford*	E. J. Whitmire Stadium; Cullowhee, NC	W 41–6	10,361	
November 12	at Marshall	Fairfield Stadium; Huntington, WV	W 41–26	6,038	
November 19	Appalachian State	E. J. Whitmire Stadium; Cullowhee, NC (rivalry)	W 44–14	12,015	
*Non-conference game
