= 1977 Central Michigan Chippewas football team =

American college football season

1977 Central Michigan Chippewas football
- Conference: Mid-American Conference
- Record: 10–1 (7–1 MAC)
- Head coach: Roy Kramer (11th season)
- Defensive coordinator: Herb Deromedi (9th season)
- MVP: Mose Rison
- Home stadium: Perry Shorts Stadium

1977 Mid-American Conference football standings
	Conf.					Overall
Team	W		L		T	W		L		T
Miami (OH) $	5	–	0	–	0	10	–	1	–	0
Central Michigan	7	–	1	–	0	10	–	1	–	0
Ball State	5	–	1	–	0	9	–	2	–	0
Bowling Green	4	–	3	–	0	5	–	7	–	0
Eastern Michigan	4	–	3	–	0	8	–	3	–	0
Kent State	5	–	4	–	0	6	–	5	–	0
Western Michigan	3	–	5	–	0	4	–	7	–	0
Northern Illinois	2	–	5	–	0	3	–	8	–	0
Toledo	2	–	7	–	0	2	–	9	–	0
Ohio	0	–	8	–	0	1	–	10	–	0
$ – Conference champion

The 1977 Central Michigan Chippewas football team was an American football team that represented Central Michigan University during the 1977 NCAA Division I football season. In their eleventh and final season under head coach Roy Kramer, the Chippewas compiled a 10–1 record, finished in second place in the Mid-American Conference, and outscored all opponents by a combined total of 317 to 155.

The team's statistical leaders were quarterback Ron Rummel with 638 passing yards, tailback Mose Rison with 1,241 rushing yards, and Wayne Schwalbach with 426 receiving yards. Rison received the team's most valuable player award.

Roy Kramer was the team's head coach. Herb Deromedi was the defensive coordinator. Dave Farris was the defensive line coach. Don Peddie was the offensive backs coach. Chris Allen was the offensive line coach. Jim Schulte was the defensive ends coach. Denny Swenson was the defensive secondary coach.

== Schedule ==
Date	Opponent	Site	Result	Attendance	Source
September 3	Alcorn State*	Perry Shorts Stadium; Mount Pleasant, MI	W 37–7	15,019	
September 10	Eastern Michigan	Perry Shorts Stadium; Mount Pleasant, MI (rivalry)	W 9–3	20,087	
September 17	at Illinois State*	Hancock Stadium; Normal, IL	W 28–7		
September 24	at Ohio	Peden Stadium; Athens, OH	W 31–14		
October 1	at Ball State	Scheumann Stadium; Muncie, IN	L 12–28		
October 8	at Northern Illinois	Huskie Stadium; DeKalb, IL	W 25–21		
October 22	Akron*	Perry Shorts Stadium; Mount Pleasant, MI	W 17–14	20,110	
October 29	Bowling Green	Perry Shorts Stadium; Mount Pleasant, MI	W 35–28	22,761	
November 5	at Kent State	Dix Stadium; Kent, OH	W 49–10		
November 12	at Toledo	Glass Bowl; Toledo, OH	W 44–0		
November 19	Western Michigan	Perry Shorts Stadium; Mount Pleasant, MI (rivalry)	W 28–23	16,747	
*Non-conference game

== Roster ==
1977 Central Michigan Chippewas football team roster
Players
Coaches
Offense

Pos.	#	Name	Class
QB	5	Gary Hogeboom	So
TE	81	Paul Matson	Sr
QB	3	Kevin Northup	Fr
QB	2	Ron Rummel	Sr

Defense

Pos.	#	Name	Class
LB	58	Tim Hollandsworth	So
LB	37	Tom Hutchinson	Fr
S	23	Robert Jackson	Fr
DE	84	Doug LaFleur	So
DB	12	Mike Ryan	Jr

Special teams

Pos.	#	Name	Class

Head coach

- Roy Kramer

Coordinators/assistant coaches

Legend

- (C) Team captain
- (S) Suspended
- (I) Ineligible
- Injured
- Redshirt
