= 1977 Houston Cougars football team =

American college football season

1977 Houston Cougars football
- Conference: Southwest Conference
- Record: 6–5 (4–4 SWC)
- Head coach: Bill Yeoman (16th season)
- Defensive coordinator: Don Todd (6th season)
- Captains: Danny Davis; Ramon Rosales; Kevin Rollwage; Vincent Greenwood
- Home stadium: Houston Astrodome

1977 Southwest Conference football standings
	Conf.					Overall
Team	W		L		T	W		L		T
No. 4 Texas $	8	–	0	–	0	11	–	1	–	0
No. 3 Arkansas	7	–	1	–	0	11	–	1	–	0
Texas A&M	6	–	2	–	0	8	–	4	–	0
Houston	4	–	4	–	0	6	–	5	–	0
Texas Tech	4	–	4	–	0	7	–	5	–	0
Baylor	3	–	5	–	0	5	–	6	–	0
SMU	3	–	5	–	0	4	–	7	–	0
TCU	1	–	7	–	0	2	–	9	–	0
Rice	0	–	8	–	0	1	–	10	–	0
$ – Conference champion; Rankings from AP Poll

The 1977 Houston Cougars football team represented the University of Houston during the 1977 NCAA Division I football season. The Cougars were led by 16th-year head coach Bill Yeoman and played their home games at the Astrodome in Houston, Texas. The team competed as members of the Southwest Conference, in their second year as full members of the league, finishing in fourth.

Houston was put on probation during this season for recruiting violations and was unable to compete in any bowl games.

== Schedule ==
Date	Opponent	Rank	Site	TV	Result	Attendance	Source
September 12	No. 11 UCLA*	No. 14	Houston Astrodome; Houston, TX	ABC	W 17–13	38,131	
September 17	at No. 10 Penn State*	No. 9	Beaver Stadium; University Park, PA		L 14–31	61,704–62,554	
September 24	at Utah*	No. 19	Robert Rice Stadium; Salt Lake City, UT		W 34–16	26,232	
October 1	Baylor	No. 19	Houston Astrodome; Houston, TX (rivalry)		W 28–24	37,421	
October 15	SMU^{†}	No. 19	Houston Astrodome; Houston, TX (rivalry)		L 23–37	30,774	
October 22	at No. 9 Arkansas		War Memorial Stadium; Little Rock, AR		L 0–34	53,924	
October 29	at TCU		Amon G. Carter Stadium; Fort Worth, TX		W 42–14	17,853	
November 5	No. 1 Texas		Rice Stadium; Houston, TX		L 21–35	72,124	
November 19	No. 16 Texas Tech		Houston Astrodome; Houston, TX (rivalry)		W 45–7	43,989	
November 26	at Rice		Rice Stadium; Houston, TX (rivalry)		W 51–21	25,000	
December 3	at No. 17 Texas A&M		Kyle Field; College Station, TX	ABC	L 7–27	51,790	
*Non-conference game; ^{†}Homecoming; Rankings from AP Poll released prior to the game
