= 1977 Ohio Bobcats football team =

American college football season

1977 Ohio Bobcats football
- Conference: Mid-American Conference
- Record: 1–10 (0–8 MAC)
- Head coach: Bill Hess (20th season)
- Home stadium: Peden Stadium

1977 Mid-American Conference football standings
	Conf.					Overall
Team	W		L		T	W		L		T
Miami (OH) $	5	–	0	–	0	10	–	1	–	0
Central Michigan	7	–	1	–	0	10	–	1	–	0
Ball State	5	–	1	–	0	9	–	2	–	0
Bowling Green	4	–	3	–	0	5	–	7	–	0
Eastern Michigan	4	–	3	–	0	8	–	3	–	0
Kent State	5	–	4	–	0	6	–	5	–	0
Western Michigan	3	–	5	–	0	4	–	7	–	0
Northern Illinois	2	–	5	–	0	3	–	8	–	0
Toledo	2	–	7	–	0	2	–	9	–	0
Ohio	0	–	8	–	0	1	–	10	–	0
$ – Conference champion

The 1977 Ohio Bobcats football team was an American football team that represented Ohio University in the Mid-American Conference (MAC) during the 1977 NCAA Division I football season. In their 20th season under head coach Bill Hess, the Bobcats compiled a 1–10 record (0–8 against MAC opponents), finished in last place in the MAC, and were outscored by all opponents by a combined total of 371 to 241. They played their home games in Peden Stadium in Athens, Ohio.

== Schedule ==
Date	Opponent	Site	Result	Attendance	Source
September 10	at Marshall*	Fairfield Stadium; Huntington, WV (rivalry)	W 49–27	15,981	
September 17	at Purdue*	Ross–Ade Stadium; West Lafayette, IN	L 7–44	49,354	
September 24	Central Michigan	Peden Stadium; Athens, OH	L 14–31		
October 1	Kent State	Peden Stadium; Athens, OH	L 23–44		
October 8	at Eastern Michigan	Rynearson Stadium; Ypsilanti, MI	L 14–31		
October 15	at Miami (OH)	Miami Field; Oxford, OH (rivalry)	L 24–28	15,587	
October 22	at Toledo	Glass Bowl; Toledo, OH	L 29–31		
October 29	Western Michigan	Peden Stadium; Athens, OH	L 22–28	1,072	
November 5	Cincinnati*	Peden Stadium; Athens, OH	L 26–38		
November 12	Bowling Green	Peden Stadium; Athens, OH	L 27–39		
November 19	at Northern Illinois	Huskie Stadium; DeKalb, IL	L 6–20		
*Non-conference game

== Roster ==
1977 Ohio Bobcats football team roster
Players			Coaches
Offense: Pos. / # / Name / Class; QB / 16 / Steve Moss / Sr	Defense: Pos. / # / Name / Class; LB / 89 / Pat Lynch / So	Special teams: Pos. / # / Name / Class	Head coach: Bill Hess; Coordinators/assistant coaches Legend: (C) Team captain; (S) Suspended; (I) Ineligible; Injured; Redshirt
