= 1977 Northern Illinois Huskies football team =

American college football season

1977 Northern Illinois Huskies football
- Conference: Mid-American Conference
- Record: 3–8 (2–5 MAC)
- Head coach: Pat Culpepper (2nd season)
- Offensive coordinator: Joe Redmond (1st season)
- MVPs: Dave Petzke; Frank Lewandoski
- Captain: All seniors
- Home stadium: Huskie Stadium

1977 Mid-American Conference football standings
	Conf.					Overall
Team	W		L		T	W		L		T
Miami (OH) $	5	–	0	–	0	10	–	1	–	0
Central Michigan	7	–	1	–	0	10	–	1	–	0
Ball State	5	–	1	–	0	9	–	2	–	0
Bowling Green	4	–	3	–	0	5	–	7	–	0
Eastern Michigan	4	–	3	–	0	8	–	3	–	0
Kent State	5	–	4	–	0	6	–	5	–	0
Western Michigan	3	–	5	–	0	4	–	7	–	0
Northern Illinois	2	–	5	–	0	3	–	8	–	0
Toledo	2	–	7	–	0	2	–	9	–	0
Ohio	0	–	8	–	0	1	–	10	–	0
$ – Conference champion

The 1977 Northern Illinois Huskies football team represented Northern Illinois University as a member of the Mid-American Conference (MAC) during 1977 NCAA Division I football season. Led by second-year head coach Pat Culpepper, the Huskies compiled an overall record of 3–8 with a mark of 2–5 in conference play, placing eighth in the MAC. Northern Illinois played home games at Huskie Stadium in DeKalb, Illinois.

== Schedule ==
Date	Opponent	Site	Result	Attendance	Source
September 3	Eastern Michigan	Huskie Stadium; DeKalb, IL	L 2–25		
September 10	at Louisville*	Fairgrounds Stadium; Louisville, KY	L 0–38	16,453	
September 17	at Wisconsin*	Camp Randall Stadium; Madison, WI	L 3–14	64,475	
September 24	at Western Michigan	Waldo Stadium; Kalamazoo, MI	L 21–49		
October 1	at Illinois State*	Hancock Stadium; Normal, IL	L 7–16		
October 8	Central Michigan	Huskie Stadium; DeKalb, IL	L 21–25		
October 15	at Ball State	Ball State Stadium; Muncie, IN (rivalry)	L 6–31		
October 22	Southern Illinois*	Huskie Stadium; DeKalb, IL	W 28–0	10,262	
October 29	at Kent State	Dix Stadium; Kent, OH	W 21–18		
November 5	Toledo	Huskie Stadium; DeKalb, IL	L 9–27		
November 19	Ohio	Huskie Stadium; DeKalb, IL	W 20–6		
*Non-conference game
