= 1977 Ball State Cardinals football team =

American college football season

1977 Ball State Cardinals football
- Conference: Mid-American Conference
- Record: 9–2 (5–1 MAC)
- Head coach: Dave McClain (7th season)
- Home stadium: Ball State Stadium

1977 Mid-American Conference football standings
	Conf.					Overall
Team	W		L		T	W		L		T
Miami (OH) $	5	–	0	–	0	10	–	1	–	0
Central Michigan	7	–	1	–	0	10	–	1	–	0
Ball State	5	–	1	–	0	9	–	2	–	0
Bowling Green	4	–	3	–	0	5	–	7	–	0
Eastern Michigan	4	–	3	–	0	8	–	3	–	0
Kent State	5	–	4	–	0	6	–	5	–	0
Western Michigan	3	–	5	–	0	4	–	7	–	0
Northern Illinois	2	–	5	–	0	3	–	8	–	0
Toledo	2	–	7	–	0	2	–	9	–	0
Ohio	0	–	8	–	0	1	–	10	–	0
$ – Conference champion

The 1977 Ball State Cardinals football team was an American football team that represented Ball State University in the Mid-American Conference (MAC) during the 1977 NCAA Division I football season. In its seventh season under head coach Dave McClain, the team compiled a 9–2 record (5–1 against conference opponents) and finished third in the MAC. The team played its home games at Ball State Stadium in Muncie, Indiana.

The team's statistical leaders included Dave Wilson with 1,589 passing yards, George Jenkins with 1,070 rushing yards, Rick Morrison with 908 receiving yards and 60 points scored.

== Schedule ==
Date	Opponent	Site	Result	Attendance	Source
September 10	at Toledo	Glass Bowl; Toledo, OH	W 43–3		
September 17	at Villanova*	Villanova Stadium; Villanova, PA	L 16–38	9,500	
September 24	at Kent State	Dix Stadium; Kent, OH	L 12–13		
October 1	Central Michigan	Ball State Stadium; Muncie, IN	W 28–12		
October 8	Illinois State*	Ball State Stadium; Muncie, IN	W 27–16	17,477	
October 15	Northern Illinois	Ball State Stadium; Muncie, IN (rivalry)	W 31–6		
October 22	Cal Poly Pomona*	Ball State Stadium; Muncie, IN	W 66–10	13,176	
October 29	at Appalachian State*	Conrad Stadium; Boone, NC	W 38–7	12,813	
November 5	at Indiana State*	Memorial Stadium; Terre Haute, IN (rivalry)	W 42–18	6,120	
November 12	at Western Michigan	Waldo Stadium; Kalamazoo, MI	W 29–25	10,500	
November 19	Eastern Michigan	Ball State Stadium; Muncie, IN	W 45–21	7,051	
*Non-conference game
