= 1977 Bowling Green Falcons football team =

American college football season

1977 Bowling Green Falcons football
- Conference: Mid-American Conference
- Record: 5–7 (4–3 MAC)
- Head coach: Denny Stolz (1st season)
- Offensive coordinator: Mike Rasmussen (1st season)
- Home stadium: Doyt Perry Stadium

1977 Mid-American Conference football standings
	Conf.					Overall
Team	W		L		T	W		L		T
Miami (OH) $	5	–	0	–	0	10	–	1	–	0
Central Michigan	7	–	1	–	0	10	–	1	–	0
Ball State	5	–	1	–	0	9	–	2	–	0
Bowling Green	4	–	3	–	0	5	–	7	–	0
Eastern Michigan	4	–	3	–	0	8	–	3	–	0
Kent State	5	–	4	–	0	6	–	5	–	0
Western Michigan	3	–	5	–	0	4	–	7	–	0
Northern Illinois	2	–	5	–	0	3	–	8	–	0
Toledo	2	–	7	–	0	2	–	9	–	0
Ohio	0	–	8	–	0	1	–	10	–	0
$ – Conference champion

The 1977 Bowling Green Falcons football team was an American football team that represented Bowling Green University in the Mid-American Conference (MAC) during the 1977 NCAA Division I football season. In their first season under head coach Denny Stolz, the Falcons compiled a 5–7 record (4–3 against MAC opponents), finished in a tie for fourth place in the MAC, and were outscored by their opponents by a combined total of 296 to 275.

The team's statistical leaders included Mark Miller with 2,103 passing yards, Dan Saleet with 572 rushing yards, and Jeff Groth with 693 receiving yards.

== Schedule ==
Date	Opponent	Site	Result	Attendance	Source
September 10	vs. Grand Valley State*	Houseman Field; Grand Rapids, MI	W 17–6	2,869	
September 17	at Eastern Michigan	Rynearson Stadium; Ypsilanti, MI	L 6–16		
September 24	Iowa State*	Doyt Perry Stadium; Bowling Green, OH	L 21–35	14,102	
October 1	Western Michigan	Doyt Perry Stadium; Bowling Green, OH	W 34–14		
October 8	Toledo	Doyt Perry Stadium; Bowling Green, OH (rivalry)	W 21–13		
October 15	at Kent State	Dix Stadium; Kent, OH (rivalry)	W 14–10		
October 22	Miami (OH)	Doyt Perry Stadium; Bowling Green, OH	L 13–33	20,039	
October 29	at Central Michigan	Perry Shorts Stadium; Mount Pleasant, MI	L 28–35	22,761	
November 5	Chattanooga*	Doyt Perry Stadium; Bowling Green, OH	L 33–37		
November 12	at Ohio	Peden Stadium; Athens, OH	W 39–27		
November 19	at Hawaii*	Aloha Stadium; Halawa, HI	L 21–41	28,034	
November 26	at Long Beach State*	Anaheim Stadium; Anaheim, CA	L 28–29	5,228	
*Non-conference game
