= 1977 Toledo Rockets football team =

American college football season

1977 Toledo Rockets football
- Conference: Mid-American Conference
- Record: 2–9 (2–7 MAC)
- Head coach: Chuck Stobart (1st season)
- Defensive coordinator: Dan Simrell (5th season)
- Home stadium: Glass Bowl

1977 Mid-American Conference football standings
	Conf.					Overall
Team	W		L		T	W		L		T
Miami (OH) $	5	–	0	–	0	10	–	1	–	0
Central Michigan	7	–	1	–	0	10	–	1	–	0
Ball State	5	–	1	–	0	9	–	2	–	0
Bowling Green	4	–	3	–	0	5	–	7	–	0
Eastern Michigan	4	–	3	–	0	8	–	3	–	0
Kent State	5	–	4	–	0	6	–	5	–	0
Western Michigan	3	–	5	–	0	4	–	7	–	0
Northern Illinois	2	–	5	–	0	3	–	8	–	0
Toledo	2	–	7	–	0	2	–	9	–	0
Ohio	0	–	8	–	0	1	–	10	–	0
$ – Conference champion

The 1977 Toledo Rockets football team was an American football team that represented the University of Toledo in the Mid-American Conference (MAC) during the 1977 NCAA Division I football season. In their first season under head coach Chuck Stobart, the Rockets compiled a 2–9 record (2–7 against MAC opponents), finished in ninth place in the MAC, and were outscored by all opponents by a combined total of 287 to 112.

The team's statistical leaders included Jeff Hepinstall with 359 passing yards, Mike Alston with 772 rushing yards, and Frank Jarm with 204 receiving yards.

== Schedule ==
Date	Opponent	Site	Result	Attendance	Source
September 10	Ball State	Glass Bowl; Toledo, OH	L 3–43		
September 17	East Carolina*	Glass Bowl; Toledo, OH	L 9–22	12,127	
September 24	at Marshall*	Fairfield Stadium; Huntington, WV	L 0–24	16,724	
October 1	at Eastern Michigan	Rynearson Stadium; Ypsilanti, MI	L 7–17		
October 8	at Bowling Green	Doyt Perry Stadium; Bowling Green, OH (rivalry)	L 13–21		
October 15	Western Michigan	Glass Bowl; Toledo, OH	L 7–28		
October 22	Ohio	Glass Bowl; Toledo, OH	W 31–29		
October 29	at Miami (OH)	Miami Field; Oxford, OH	L 3–27	17,006	
November 5	at Northern Illinois	Huskie Stadium; DeKalb, IL	W 27–9		
November 12	Central Michigan	Glass Bowl; Toledo, OH	L 0–44		
November 19	Kent State	Glass Bowl; Toledo, OH	L 12–23	6,782	
*Non-conference game
