= 1977 Eastern Michigan Hurons football team =

American college football season

1977 Eastern Michigan Hurons football
- Conference: Mid-American Conference
- Record: 8–3 (4–3 MAC)
- Head coach: Ed Chlebek (2nd season)
- Captains: Terry Butz; Ron Johnson; Al Slamer
- Home stadium: Rynearson Stadium

1977 Mid-American Conference football standings
	Conf.					Overall
Team	W		L		T	W		L		T
Miami (OH) $	5	–	0	–	0	10	–	1	–	0
Central Michigan	7	–	1	–	0	10	–	1	–	0
Ball State	5	–	1	–	0	9	–	2	–	0
Bowling Green	4	–	3	–	0	5	–	7	–	0
Eastern Michigan	4	–	3	–	0	8	–	3	–	0
Kent State	5	–	4	–	0	6	–	5	–	0
Western Michigan	3	–	5	–	0	4	–	7	–	0
Northern Illinois	2	–	5	–	0	3	–	8	–	0
Toledo	2	–	7	–	0	2	–	9	–	0
Ohio	0	–	8	–	0	1	–	10	–	0
$ – Conference champion

The 1977 Eastern Michigan Hurons football team represented Eastern Michigan University in the 1977 NCAA Division I football season. In their second and final season under head coach Ed Chlebek, the Hurons compiled an 8–3 record (4–3 against conference opponents), finished in fourth place in the Mid-American Conference, and outscored their opponents, 239 to 195. The team's statistical leaders included Steve Raklovits with 1,784 passing yards, Bobby Windom with 1,322 rushing yards, and James Hall with 646 receiving yards.

== Schedule ==
Date	Opponent	Site	Result	Attendance	Source
September 3	at Northern Illinois	Huskie Stadium; DeKalb, IL	W 25–2		
September 10	at Central Michigan	Perry Shorts Stadium; Mount Pleasant, MI (rivalry)	L 3–9	20,087	
September 17	Bowling Green	Rynearson Stadium; Ypsilanti, MI	W 16–6		
September 24	McNeese State*	Rynearson Stadium; Ypsilanti, MI	W 9–7	7,250	
October 1	Toledo	Rynearson Stadium; Ypsilanti, MI	W 17–7		
October 8	Ohio ^{†}	Rynearson Stadium; Ypsilanti, MI	W 31–14		
October 22	Kent State	Rynearson Stadium; Ypsilanti, MI	L 13–29		
October 29	at Akron*	Rubber Bowl; Akron, OH	W 42–28	6,168	
November 5	at North Carolina A&T*	World War Memorial Stadium; Greensboro, NC	W 21–20	5,000	
November 12	Illinois State*	Rynearson Stadium; Ypsilanti, MI	W 41–28		
November 19	at Ball State	Ball State Stadium; Muncie, IN	L 21–45	7,051	
*Non-conference game; ^{†}Homecoming

== After the season ==
The following Huron was selected in the 1978 NFL draft after the season.

Round	Pick	Player	Position	NFL club
1	22	Ron Johnson	Defensive back	Pittsburgh Steelers
