= 1977 TCU Horned Frogs football team =

American college football season

1977 TCU Horned Frogs football
- Conference: Southwest Conference
- Record: 2–9 (1–7 SWC)
- Head coach: F. A. Dry (1st season)
- Offensive scheme: Pro-style
- Defensive coordinator: Bob Junko (2nd season)
- Base defense: 4–3
- Home stadium: Amon G. Carter Stadium

1977 Southwest Conference football standings
	Conf.					Overall
Team	W		L		T	W		L		T
No. 4 Texas $	8	–	0	–	0	11	–	1	–	0
No. 3 Arkansas	7	–	1	–	0	11	–	1	–	0
Texas A&M	6	–	2	–	0	8	–	4	–	0
Houston	4	–	4	–	0	6	–	5	–	0
Texas Tech	4	–	4	–	0	7	–	5	–	0
Baylor	3	–	5	–	0	5	–	6	–	0
SMU	3	–	5	–	0	4	–	7	–	0
TCU	1	–	7	–	0	2	–	9	–	0
Rice	0	–	8	–	0	1	–	10	–	0
$ – Conference champion; Rankings from AP Poll

The 1977 TCU Horned Frogs football team represented Texas Christian University (TCU) in the 1977 NCAA Division I football season. The Horned Frogs finished the season 2–9 overall and 1–7 in the Southwest Conference. The team was coached by F. A. Dry, in his first year as head coach. The Frogs played their home games in Amon G. Carter Stadium, which is located on campus in Fort Worth, Texas.

== Schedule ==
Date	Opponent	Site	Result	Attendance	Source
September 10	SMU	Amon G. Carter Stadium; Fort Worth, TX (rivalry)	L 21–45	19,576	
September 17	Oregon*	Amon G. Carter Stadium; Fort Worth, TX	L 24–29	15,031	
September 24	at No. 2 USC*	Los Angeles Memorial Coliseum; Los Angeles, CA	L 0–51	54,620	
October 1	No. 12 Arkansas	Amon G. Carter Stadium; Fort Worth, TX	L 6–42	22,713	
October 8	at Rice	Rice Stadium; Houston, TX	W 35–15	12,000	
October 22	Miami (FL)*	Amon G. Carter Stadium; Fort Worth, TX	W 21–17	12,224	
October 29	Houston	Amon G. Carter Stadium; Fort Worth, TX	L 14–42	17,853	
November 5	at Texas Tech	Jones Stadium; Lubbock, TX (rivalry)	L 17–49	42,124	
November 12	at No. 1 Texas	Texas Memorial Stadium; Austin, TX (rivalry)	L 14–44	50,150	
November 19	No. 14 Texas A&M	Amon G. Carter Stadium; Fort Worth, TX (rivalry)	L 23–52	28,563	
November 26	at Baylor	Baylor Stadium; Waco, TX (rivalry)	L 9–48	15,000	
*Non-conference game; Rankings from AP Poll released prior to the game

== Roster ==
1977 TCU Horned Frogs football team roster
Players
Coaches
Offense

Pos.	#	Name	Class
RB	24	Tony Accomando	Sr
WR	26	Mike Renfro	Sr
TE	86	James Wright

Defense

Pos.	#	Name	Class
DT	79	Marshall Harris	Jr

Special teams

Pos.	#	Name	Class

Head coach

- F. A. Dry

Coordinators/assistant coaches

Legend

- (C) Team captain
- (S) Suspended
- (I) Ineligible
- Injured
- Redshirt
