= 1977 Baylor Bears football team =

American college football season

1977 Baylor Bears football
- Conference: Southwest Conference
- Record: 5–6 (3–5 SWC)
- Head coach: Grant Teaff (6th season)
- Home stadium: Baylor Stadium

1977 Southwest Conference football standings
	Conf.					Overall
Team	W		L		T	W		L		T
No. 4 Texas $	8	–	0	–	0	11	–	1	–	0
No. 3 Arkansas	7	–	1	–	0	11	–	1	–	0
Texas A&M	6	–	2	–	0	8	–	4	–	0
Houston	4	–	4	–	0	6	–	5	–	0
Texas Tech	4	–	4	–	0	7	–	5	–	0
Baylor	3	–	5	–	0	5	–	6	–	0
SMU	3	–	5	–	0	4	–	7	–	0
TCU	1	–	7	–	0	2	–	9	–	0
Rice	0	–	8	–	0	1	–	10	–	0
$ – Conference champion; Rankings from AP Poll

The 1977 Baylor Bears football team represented the Baylor University in the 1977 NCAA Division I football season. The Bears finished the season sixth in the Southwest Conference.

== Schedule ==
Date	Opponent	Site	Result	Attendance	Source
September 10	No. 8 Texas Tech	Baylor Stadium; Waco, TX (rivalry)	L 7–17	45,800	
September 17	Kentucky*	Baylor Stadium; Waco, TX	W 21–6	30,000	
September 24	at No. 14 Nebraska*	Memorial Stadium; Lincoln, NE	L 10–31	76,231	
October 1	at No. 19 Houston	Houston Astrodome; Houston, TX (rivalry)	L 24–28	37,421	
October 8	SMU	Baylor Stadium; Waco, TX	W 9–6	30,300	
October 15	No. 13 Texas A&M	Baylor Stadium; Waco, TX (rivalry)	L 31–38	45,000	
October 22	Air Force*^{†}	Baylor Stadium; Waco, TX	W 38–7	30,350	
November 5	at No. 8 Arkansas	War Memorial Stadium; Little Rock, AR	L 9–35	53,620	
November 12	Rice	Baylor Stadium; Waco, TX	W 24–14	25,000	
November 19	at No. 1 Texas	Texas Memorial Stadium; Austin, TX (rivalry)	L 7–29	60,000	
November 26	TCU	Baylor Stadium; Waco, TX (rivalry)	W 47–9	15,000	
*Non-conference game; ^{†}Homecoming; Rankings from AP Poll released prior to the game
