= 1977 Furman Paladins football team =

American college football season

1977 Furman Paladins football
- Conference: Southern Conference
- Record: 4–5–2 (3–2–1 SoCon)
- Head coach: Art Baker (5th season)
- Captains: Jimmy Neal; Oliver Cooper; Bobby Church
- Home stadium: Sirrine Stadium

1977 Southern Conference football standings
	Conf.					Overall
Team	W		L		T	W		L		T
Chattanooga +	4	–	1	–	0	9	–	1	–	1
VMI +	4	–	1	–	0	7	–	4	–	0
The Citadel	3	–	2	–	0	5	–	6	–	0
Furman	3	–	2	–	1	4	–	5	–	2
Western Carolina	2	–	2	–	1	6	–	4	–	1
Appalachian State	1	–	4	–	0	2	–	9	–	0
Marshall	0	–	5	–	0	2	–	9	–	0
Davidson	0	–	0	–	0	4	–	6	–	0
+ – Conference co-champions; VMI's games against William & Mary, East Carolina, and Richmond and Marshall's game against Louisville were designated as conference games and counted in the SoCon standings.

The 1977 Furman Paladins football team was an American football team that represented Furman University as a member of the Southern Conference (SoCon) during the 1977 NCAA Division I football season. In their fifth season under head coach Art Baker, Furman compiled a 4–5–2 record, with a mark of 3–2–1 in conference play, placing third in the SoCon.

== Schedule ==
Date	Opponent	Site	Result	Attendance	Source
September 10	at Wake Forest*	Groves Stadium; Winston-Salem, NC	L 13–24	20,200	
September 17	East Tennessee State*	Sirrine Stadium; Greenville, SC	W 42–12	13,000	
September 24	at Chattanooga	Chamberlain Field; Chattanooga, TN	W 17–7	9,000	
October 1	Western Carolina	Sirrine Stadium; Greenville, SC	T 24–24	10,000	
October 8	at Wofford*	Snyder Field; Spartanburg, SC (rivalry)	L 7–13		
October 15	Marshall	Sirrine Stadium; Greenville, SC	W 42–24	12,000	
October 22	Appalachian State	Sirrine Stadium; Greenville, SC	W 28–20	9,500	
October 29	Presbyterian*	Sirrine Stadium; Greenville, SC	T 13–13	10,200	
November 5	at Richmond*	City Stadium; Richmond, VA	L 13–19	12,000	
November 12	VMI	Sirrine Stadium; Greenville, SC	L 28–31	10,000	
November 19	at The Citadel	Johnson Hagood Stadium; Charleston, SC (rivalry)	L 3–10		
*Non-conference game
