= 1977 Rice Owls football team =

American college football season

1977 Rice Owls football
- Conference: Southwest Conference
- Record: 1–10 (0–8 SWC)
- Head coach: Homer Rice (2nd season)
- Home stadium: Rice Stadium

1977 Southwest Conference football standings
	Conf.					Overall
Team	W		L		T	W		L		T
No. 4 Texas $	8	–	0	–	0	11	–	1	–	0
No. 3 Arkansas	7	–	1	–	0	11	–	1	–	0
Texas A&M	6	–	2	–	0	8	–	4	–	0
Houston	4	–	4	–	0	6	–	5	–	0
Texas Tech	4	–	4	–	0	7	–	5	–	0
Baylor	3	–	5	–	0	5	–	6	–	0
SMU	3	–	5	–	0	4	–	7	–	0
TCU	1	–	7	–	0	2	–	9	–	0
Rice	0	–	8	–	0	1	–	10	–	0
$ – Conference champion; Rankings from AP Poll

The 1977 Rice Owls football team was an American football team that represented Rice University in the Southwest Conference during the 1977 NCAA Division I football season. In their second year under head coach Homer Rice, the team compiled a 1–10 record.

Coach Rice departed following the season to become head coach of the National Football League's Cincinnati Bengals.

== Schedule ==
Date	Opponent	Site	Result	Attendance	Source
September 10	Idaho*	Rice Stadium; Houston, TX	W 31–10	14,000	
September 17	No. 19 Florida*	Rice Stadium; Houston, TX	L 3–48	24,000	
September 24	at LSU*	Tiger Stadium; Baton Rouge, LA	L 0–77	67,844	
October 1	at No. 8 Texas	Texas Memorial Stadium; Austin, TX (rivalry)	L 15–72	47,500	
October 8	TCU	Rice Stadium; Houston, TX	L 15–35	12,000	
October 15	at No. 15 Texas Tech	Jones Stadium; Lubbock, TX	L 7–42	42,689	
October 22	No. 12 Texas A&M	Rice Stadium; Houston, TX	L 14–28	57,500	
October 29	No. 8 Arkansas	Rice Stadium; Houston, TX	L 7–30	20,000	
November 5	at SMU	Cotton Bowl; Dallas, TX (rivalry)	L 24–41	6,918	
November 12	at Baylor	Baylor Stadium; Waco, TX	L 14–24	25,000	
November 26	Houston	Rice Stadium; Houston, TX (rivalry)	L 21–51	25,000	
*Non-conference game; Rankings from AP Poll released prior to the game
