= 1977 Texas Tech Red Raiders football team =

American college football season

1977 Texas Tech Red Raiders football

Tangerine Bowl, L 17–40 vs. Florida State
- Conference: Southwest Conference
- Record: 7–5 (4–4 SWC)
- Head coach: Steve Sloan (3rd season)
- Offensive coordinator: Rex Dockery (3rd season)
- Offensive scheme: Option
- Defensive coordinator: Bill Parcells (3rd season)
- Base defense: 3–4
- Home stadium: Jones Stadium

1977 Southwest Conference football standings
	Conf.					Overall
Team	W		L		T	W		L		T
No. 4 Texas $	8	–	0	–	0	11	–	1	–	0
No. 3 Arkansas	7	–	1	–	0	11	–	1	–	0
Texas A&M	6	–	2	–	0	8	–	4	–	0
Houston	4	–	4	–	0	6	–	5	–	0
Texas Tech	4	–	4	–	0	7	–	5	–	0
Baylor	3	–	5	–	0	5	–	6	–	0
SMU	3	–	5	–	0	4	–	7	–	0
TCU	1	–	7	–	0	2	–	9	–	0
Rice	0	–	8	–	0	1	–	10	–	0
$ – Conference champion; Rankings from AP Poll

The 1977 Texas Tech Red Raiders football team represented Texas Tech University as a member of the Southwest Conference (SWC) during the 1977 NCAA Division I football season. In their third and final season under head coach Steve Sloan, the Red Raiders compiled a 7–5 record (4–4 against SWC opponents), outscored opponents by a combined total of 279 to 246, and finished in a tie for fourth place in the SWC. The team played its home games at Clifford B. and Audrey Jones Stadium in Lubbock, Texas.

== Schedule ==
Date	Opponent	Rank	Site	Result	Attendance	Source
September 10	at Baylor	No. 8	Baylor Stadium; Waco, TX (rivalry)	W 17–7	45,800	
September 17	New Mexico*	No. 8	Jones Stadium; Lubbock, TX	W 49–14	45,108	
September 24	No. 6 Texas A&M	No. 7	Jones Stadium; Lubbock, TX (rivalry)	L 17–33	55,008	
October 1	at North Carolina*	No. 13	Kenan Memorial Stadium; Chapel Hill, NC	W 10–7	48,000	
October 8	at Arizona*	No. 17	Arizona Stadium; Tucson, AZ	W 32–26	41,500	
October 15	Rice	No. 15	Jones Stadium; Lubbock, TX	W 42–7	42,689	
October 29	at No. 1 Texas	No. 14	Texas Memorial Stadium; Austin, TX (rivalry)	L 0–26	77,809	
November 5	TCU^{†}		Jones Stadium; Lubbock, Texas (rivalry)	W 49–17	42,124	
November 12	at SMU	No. 18	Cotton Bowl; Dallas, TX	W 45–7	21,689	
November 19	at Houston	No. 16	Houston Astrodome; Houston, TX (rivalry)	L 7–45	43,989	
November 24	No. 6 Arkansas		Jones Stadium; Lubbock, TX (rivalry)	L 14–17	32,856	
December 23	vs. No. 19 Florida State*		Orlando Stadium; Orlando, FL (Tangerine Bowl)	L 17–40	44,502	
*Non-conference game; ^{†}Homecoming; Rankings from AP Poll released prior to the game

== Game summaries ==
=== Vs. No. 19 Florida State (Tangerine Bowl) ===
	1	2	3	4	Total
Red Raiders	0	3	6	8	17
No. 19 Seminoles	3	13	11	13	40

== Personnel ==
1977 Texas Tech Red Raiders football team roster
Players
Coaches
Offense

Pos.	#	Name	Class
QB		Tres Adami
TE		Gregg Adkins
QB		Rodney Allison
OL		Terry Anderson
RB		Sam Bailey
TE		James Hadnot
TE		Mark Harrelson
OL		Dan Irons
QB		Mark Johnson
RB		Mark Julian
WR		Howie Lewis
OL		Larry Martin
RB		Eddie Monaco
WR		Brian Nelson
RB		Chris Orr
RB		Billy Taylor
WR		Godfrey Turner
OL		Joe Walstad
OL		Ken Walter
OL		Greg Wessels
RB		Jimmy Williams
WR		Sammy Williams

Defense

Pos.	#	Name	Class
DL		Richard Arledge
DB		Larry Dupre
DB		Eric Felton
DB		Larry Flowers
DB		Greg Frazier
DL		David Hill
LB		Don Kelly
DL		Jim Krahl
LB		Gary McCright
LB		Mike Mock
DL		Curtis Reed
DB		Willie Stephens
DL		Kim Taliaferro
DL		Andrew Thomas
DL		Olan Tisdale

Special teams

Pos.	#	Name	Class
K		Bill Adams
K		Mike Mock
P		Eric Jones

Head coach

- Steve Sloan

Coordinators/assistant coaches

- Rex Dockery
  Offensive coordinator
- Bill Parcells
  Defensive coordinator/Linebackers
- John Cropp
  Wide receivers/tight ends

Legend

- (C) Team captain
- (S) Suspended
- (I) Ineligible
- Injured
- Redshirt
