= 1977 Western Kentucky Hilltoppers football team =

American college football season

1977 Western Kentucky Hilltoppers football
- Conference: Ohio Valley Conference
- Record: 1–8–1 (1–5–1 OVC)
- Head coach: Jimmy Feix (10th season)
- Captains: Chip Carpenter; Biff Madon
- Home stadium: L. T. Smith Stadium

1977 Ohio Valley Conference football standings
	Conf.					Overall
Team	W		L		T	W		L		T
Austin Peay $	6	–	1	–	0	8	–	3	–	0
Tennessee Tech	5	–	2	–	0	9	–	2	–	0
Eastern Kentucky	4	–	3	–	0	5	–	5	–	0
Murray State	4	–	3	–	0	6	–	5	–	0
Middle Tennessee	3	–	4	–	0	3	–	8	–	0
Morehead State	2	–	4	–	1	2	–	6	–	2
East Tennessee State	2	–	5	–	0	3	–	8	–	0
Western Kentucky	1	–	5	–	1	1	–	8	–	1
$ – Conference champion

The 1977 Western Kentucky football team represented Western Kentucky University during the 1977 NCAA Division II football season. Led by tenth-year head coach Jimmy Feix, the Hilltoppers compiled an overall record of 1–8–1 with a mark of 1–5–1 in conference play, placing last out of eight teams in the OVC. The team's captains were Chip Carpenter and Biff Madon.

== Schedule ==
Date	Opponent	Site	Result	Attendance	Source
September 10	Chattanooga*	L. T. Smith Stadium; Bowling Green, KY	L 3–27	16,500	
September 17	at Akron*	Rubber Bowl; Akron, OH	L 3–24	31,792	
September 24	at Austin Peay	Municipal Stadium; Clarksville, TN	L 3–21	8,600	
October 1	East Tennessee State	L. T. Smith Stadium; Bowling Green, KY	W 33–13	10,500	
October 8	at No. 7 Northern Michigan*	Marquette, MI	L 0–39	5,346	
October 15	No. T–8 Tennessee Tech	L. T. Smith Stadium; Bowling Green, KY	L 20–31	13,500	
October 22	at Eastern Kentucky	Hanger Field; Richmond, KY (Battle of the Bluegrass)	L 10–35	25,000	
October 29	Morehead State^{†}	L. T. Smith Stadium; Bowling Green, KY	T 20–20	19,750	
November 5	at Middle Tennessee	Horace Jones Field; Murfreesboro, TN (rivalry)	L 19–21	2,800	
November 19	Murray State	L. T. Smith Stadium; Bowling Green, KY (Battle for the Red Belt)	L 13–21	11,700	
*Non-conference game; ^{†}Homecoming; Rankings from AP Poll released prior to the game
