= 1977 Clemson Tigers football team =

American college football season

1977 Clemson Tigers football

Gator Bowl, L 3–34 vs. Pittsburgh
- Conference: Atlantic Coast Conference

Ranking
- AP: No. 19
- Record: 8–3–1 (4–1–1 ACC)
- Head coach: Charley Pell (1st season)
- Offensive coordinator: Jimmye Laycock (1st season)
- Defensive coordinator: Mickey Andrews (1st season)
- Captains: Steve Fuller; Steve Godfrey; Randy Scott
- Home stadium: Memorial Stadium

1977 Atlantic Coast Conference football standings
	Conf.					Overall
Team	W		L		T	W		L		T
No. 17 North Carolina $	5	–	0	–	1	8	–	3	–	1
No. 19 Clemson	4	–	1	–	1	8	–	3	–	1
NC State	4	–	2	–	0	8	–	4	–	0
Maryland	4	–	2	–	0	8	–	4	–	0
Duke	2	–	4	–	0	5	–	6	–	0
Virginia	1	–	5	–	0	1	–	9	–	1
Wake Forest	0	–	6	–	0	1	–	10	–	0
$ – Conference champion; Rankings from AP Poll

The 1977 Clemson Tigers football team was an American football team that represented Clemson University in the Atlantic Coast Conference (ACC) during the 1977 NCAA Division I football season. In its first season under head coach Charley Pell, the team compiled an 8–3–1 record (4–1–1 against conference opponents), finished second in the ACC, lost to Pittsburgh in the 1977 Gator Bowl, was ranked No. 19 in the final AP Poll, and outscored opponents by a total of 228 to 163. The team played its home games at Memorial Stadium in Clemson, South Carolina.

Steve Fuller, Steve Godfrey, and Randy Scott were the team captains. The team's statistical leaders included Steve Fuller with 1,497 passing yards, Warren Ratchford with 616 rushing yards, Jerry Butler with 760 receiving yards, and Lester Brown with 54 points (9 touchdowns).

== Schedule ==
Date	Time	Opponent	Rank	Site	Result	Attendance	Source
September 10	1:00 p.m.	No. 10 Maryland		Memorial Stadium; Clemson, SC	L 14–21	34,650	
September 17	1:30 p.m.	at No. 17 Georgia*		Sanford Stadium; Athens, GA (rivalry)	W 7–6	55,100	
September 24	1:30 p.m.	at Georgia Tech*		Grant Field; Atlanta, GA (rivalry)	W 31–14	50,116	
October 1	1:30 p.m.	at Virginia Tech*		Lane Stadium; Blacksburg, VA	W 31–13	34,000	
October 8	1:00 p.m.	Virginia^{†}		Memorial Stadium; Clemson, SC	W 31–0	49,830	
October 15	1:30 p.m.	at Duke		Wallace Wade Stadium; Durham, NC	W 17–11	26,500	
October 22	1:00 p.m.	NC State	No. 20	Memorial Stadium; Clemson, SC (rivalry)	W 7–3	50,304	
October 29	1:30 p.m.	Wake Forest	No. 16	Memorial Stadium; Clemson, SC	W 26–0	40,445–40,600	
November 5	1:30 p.m.	at North Carolina	No. 13	Kenan Memorial Stadium; Chapel Hill, NC	T 13–13	50,500	
November 12	1:00 p.m.	No. 5 Notre Dame*	No. 15	Memorial Stadium; Clemson, SC	L 17–21	53,467–54,189	
November 19	1:30 p.m.	at South Carolina*	No. 15	Williams–Brice Stadium; Columbia, SC (rivalry)	W 31–27	56,410	
December 30		vs. No. 10 Pittsburgh *	No. 11	Gator Bowl Stadium; Jacksonville, FL (Gator Bowl)	L 3–34	72,289	
*Non-conference game; ^{†}Homecoming; Rankings from AP Poll released prior to the game; All times are in Eastern time

== Roster ==
1977 Clemson Tigers football team roster
Players
Coaches
Offense

Pos.	#	Name	Class
OL	64	Jimmy Wells	Jr
OL	55	Jeff Bostic	So
WR	16	Jerry Butler	Jr
RB	22	Ken Callicutt	Sr
WR	30	Dwight Clark	Jr
QB	4	Steve Fuller (C)	Jr
OL	53	Steve Kenney	Jr

Defense

Pos.	#	Name	Class
DT	65	Archie Reese	Sr
DT	83	Jim Stuckey	So

Special teams

Pos.	#	Name	Class

Head coach

- Charley Pell

Coordinators/assistant coaches

Legend

- (C) Team captain
- (S) Suspended
- (I) Ineligible
- Injured
- Redshirt

Roster

== Game summaries ==
=== South Carolina ===
Team	1	2	3	4	Total
• Clemson	10	7	7	7	31
South Carolina	0	0	7	20	27

- Date: November 19
- Location: Williams–Brice Stadium, Columbia, South Carolina
- Game attendance: 56,410

Scoring summary
1		CLEM	Ratchford 4 yard run (Ariri kick)	CLEM 7–0
1		CLEM	Ariri 18 yard field goal	CLEM 10–0
2		CLEM	Brown 1 yard run (Ariri kick)	CLEM 17–0
3		CLEM	Callicutt 52 yard run (Ariri kick)	CLEM 24–0
3		SCAR	Clark 77 yard run (Parrish kick)	CLEM 24–7
4		SCAR	Dorsey 11 yard run (Parrish kick)	CLEM 24–14
4		SCAR	Dorsey 1 yard run (pass failed)	CLEM 24–20
4		SCAR	Logan 40 yard pass from Bass (Parrish kick)	SCAR 27–24
4	:49	CLEM	Butler 20 yard pass from Fuller (Ariri kick)	CLEM 31–27
