= Joe Bostic =

American football player (born 1957)

No. 71
- Positions: Guard, tackle

Personal information
- Born: April 20, 1957 (age 69); Greensboro, North Carolina, U.S.
- Listed height: 6 ft 3 in (1.91 m)
- Listed weight: 265 lb (120 kg)

Career information
- High school: Greensboro (NC) Smith
- College: Clemson
- NFL draft: 1979: 3rd round, 64th overall pick

Career history
- St. Louis/Phoenix Cardinals (1979–1989)

Awards and highlights
- First-team All-American (1977); Second-team All-American (1978); First-team All-ACC (1977)

Career NFL statistics
- Games played: 132
- Games started: 115
- Fumble recoveries: 2
- Stats at Pro Football Reference

Joe Earl Bostic Jr. (born April 20, 1957) is an American former professional football player who was an offensive lineman, primarily at guard, for 11 seasons with the St. Louis/Phoenix Cardinals of the National Football League (NFL). He was the Cardinals' third-round selection in the 1979 NFL draft.

He played high school football at Ben L. Smith High School in Greensboro, North Carolina, and college football for the Clemson Tigers. He is the older brother of fellow NFL player Jeff Bostic.

Bostic was inducted into the South Carolina Football Hall of Fame in 2023. He has also previously been inducted into the Guilford County Sports Hall of Fame (2008), South Carolina Athletic Hall of Fame (2000), North Carolina Sports Hall of Fame (2015), and the Clemson Athletic Hall of Fame (1996).
