= 1977 Texas A&M Aggies football team =

American college football season

1977 Texas A&M Aggies football

Astro-Bluebonnet Bowl, L 28–47 vs. USC
- Conference: Southwest Conference
- Record: 8–4 (6–2 SWC)
- Head coach: Emory Bellard (6th season)
- Offensive coordinator: Tom Wilson (3rd season)
- Offensive scheme: Wishbone
- Defensive coordinator: Melvin Robertson (6th season)
- Home stadium: Kyle Field

1977 Southwest Conference football standings
	Conf.					Overall
Team	W		L		T	W		L		T
No. 4 Texas $	8	–	0	–	0	11	–	1	–	0
No. 3 Arkansas	7	–	1	–	0	11	–	1	–	0
Texas A&M	6	–	2	–	0	8	–	4	–	0
Houston	4	–	4	–	0	6	–	5	–	0
Texas Tech	4	–	4	–	0	7	–	5	–	0
Baylor	3	–	5	–	0	5	–	6	–	0
SMU	3	–	5	–	0	4	–	7	–	0
TCU	1	–	7	–	0	2	–	9	–	0
Rice	0	–	8	–	0	1	–	10	–	0
$ – Conference champion; Rankings from AP Poll

The 1977 Texas A&M Aggies football team was an American football team that represented Texas A&M University as a member of the Southwest Conference (SWC) during the 1977 NCAA Division I football season. In their sixth year under head coach Emory Bellard, the team compiled an overall record of 8–4, with a mark of 6–2 in conference play, and finished third in the SWC.

== Schedule ==
Date	Opponent	Rank	Site	TV	Result	Attendance	Source
September 10	Kansas*	No. 9	Kyle Field; College Station, TX		W 28–14	51,494–53,585	
September 17	at Virginia Tech*	No. 7	Lane Stadium; Blacksburg, VA		W 27–6	33,500	
September 24	at No. 7 Texas Tech	No. 6	Jones Stadium; Lubbock, TX (rivalry)		W 33–17	55,008	
October 1	at No. 3 Michigan*	No. 5	Michigan Stadium; Ann Arbor, MI	ABC	L 3–41	104,802	
October 15	at Baylor	No. 13	Baylor Stadium; Waco, TX (rivalry)		W 38–31	45,000	
October 22	at Rice	No. 12	Rice Stadium; Houston, TX		W 28–14	57,500	
October 29	SMU	No. 11	Kyle Field; College Station, TX		W 38–21	53,932	
November 12	No. 8 Arkansas	No. 11	Kyle Field; College Station, TX (rivalry)		L 20–26	54,000	
November 19	at TCU	No. 14	Amon G. Carter Stadium; Fort Worth, TX (rivalry)		W 52–23	28,563	
November 26	No. 1 Texas	No. 12	Kyle Field; College Station, Texas (rivalry)		L 28–57	57,443	
December 3	Houston	No. 17	Kyle Field; College Station, TX	ABC-R	W 27–7	51,790	
December 31	vs. No. 20 USC*	No. 17	Houston Astrodome; Houston, TX (Astro-Bluebonnet Bowl)	Mizlou	L 28–47	52,842	
*Non-conference game; Rankings from AP Poll released prior to the game

== Roster ==
1977 Texas A&M Aggies football team roster
Players
Coaches
Offense

Pos.	#	Name	Class
RB	40	Adger Armstrong	Jr
RB		David Brothers
TE		Chuck Carr
RB		Jay Dale
C	68	Mark Dennard	Sr
RB	22	Curtis Dickey	So
OL		Preston Dickson
OL		Thomas Gregory
OL		Zach Guthrie
RB		Eddie Hardin
OL		Doug Holmes
G	75	Kenny Kirk	Jr
TE	81	Russell Mikeska	Jr
QB	11	Mike Mosley	Fr
OT	60	Frank Myers	Sr
G	79	Ed Pustejovsky	So
OT	70	Cody Risien	Jr
TE		Phillip Sampson
WR		Darrell Smith
WR	84	Doug Teague	Jr
QB		David Walker
RB		George Woodard

Defense

Pos.	#	Name	Class
DE	89	Phil Bennett	Sr
LB	93	Doug Carr	Fr
DB		Gregory Clark
DL		Johnnie Donahue
DE	77	Jacob Green	So
DB		Carl Grulich
DB		Jimmy Hamilton
DL		Eddie Heath
LB		Frankie Lemmons
DL		Gary Milligan
LB		Kevin Monk
LB		Floyd Randle
LB		Roderick Reed
DT	91	Steve Spitzenberger	Sr
DB		Elroy Steen
DB		Kenneth Taylor
DB	10	Mike Williams	Sr
DL		James Zachery

Special teams

Pos.	#	Name	Class
P	4	David Appleby	So
K	1	Tony Franklin	Jr

Head coach

- Emory Bellard

Coordinators/assistant coaches

Legend

- (C) Team captain
- (S) Suspended
- (I) Ineligible
- Injured
- Redshirt
