= 1977 Miami Redskins football team =

American college football season

1977 Miami Redskins football

MAC champion
- Conference: Mid-American Conference
- Record: 10–1 (5–0 MAC)
- Head coach: Dick Crum (4th season)
- Home stadium: Miami Field

1977 Mid-American Conference football standings
	Conf.					Overall
Team	W		L		T	W		L		T
Miami (OH) $	5	–	0	–	0	10	–	1	–	0
Central Michigan	7	–	1	–	0	10	–	1	–	0
Ball State	5	–	1	–	0	9	–	2	–	0
Bowling Green	4	–	3	–	0	5	–	7	–	0
Eastern Michigan	4	–	3	–	0	8	–	3	–	0
Kent State	5	–	4	–	0	6	–	5	–	0
Western Michigan	3	–	5	–	0	4	–	7	–	0
Northern Illinois	2	–	5	–	0	3	–	8	–	0
Toledo	2	–	7	–	0	2	–	9	–	0
Ohio	0	–	8	–	0	1	–	10	–	0
$ – Conference champion

The 1977 Miami Redskins football team was an American football team that represented Miami University during the 1977 NCAA Division I football season. In their fourth season under head coach Dick Crum, the Redskins tied for the Mid-American Conference (MAC) championship, compiled a 10–1 record (5–0 against MAC opponents) and outscored all opponents by a combined total of 262 to 173. The team's sole loss came against South Carolina by a 42–19 score in the second week of the season.

The team's statistical leaders included Larry Fortner with 1,473 passing yards, Mark Hunter with 809 rushing yards, and Paul Warth with 540 receiving yards.

== Schedule ==
Date	Opponent	Site	Result	Attendance	Source
September 3	at Dayton*	Welcome Stadium; Dayton, OH	W 26–23	11,632	
September 17	at South Carolina*	Williams–Brice Stadium; Columbia, SC	L 19–42	46,234	
September 24	at Indiana*	Memorial Stadium; Bloomington, IN	W 21–20	28,732	
October 1	at Yale*	Yale Bowl; New Haven, CT	W 28–14	19,026	
October 8	Marshall*	Miami Field; Oxford, OH	W 29–19	10,544	
October 15	Ohio	Miami Field; Oxford, OH (rivalry)	W 28–24	15,587	
October 22	at Bowling Green	Doyt Perry Stadium; Bowling Green, OH	W 33–13	20,039	
October 29	Toledo	Miami Field; Oxford, OH	W 27–3	17,006	
November 5	at Western Michigan	Waldo Stadium; Kalamazoo, MI	W 14–8	21,800	
November 12	at Kent State	Dix Stadium; Kent, OH	W 25–0	5,421	
November 24	at Cincinnati*	Nippert Stadium; Cincinnati, OH (rivalry)	W 12–7	13,550	
*Non-conference game

== Roster ==
1977 Miami Redskins football team roster
Players
Coaches
Offense

Pos.	#	Name	Class
QB	2	John McIntosh	Fr
WR	16	Alvin Hall	So

Defense

Pos.	#	Name	Class
S	1	Pat McDermott	Sr

Special teams

Pos.	#	Name	Class

Head coach

- Dick Crum

Coordinators/assistant coaches

- Jim Bollman (GA)

Legend

- (C) Team captain
- (S) Suspended
- (I) Ineligible
- Injured
- Redshirt

Roster
