= 1977 Western Michigan Broncos football team =

American college football season

1977 Western Michigan Broncos football
- Conference: Mid-American Conference
- Record: 4–7 (3–5 MAC)
- Head coach: Elliot Uzelac (3rd season)
- MVP: Jerome Persell
- Captains: Howard Nevins; Keith Rogien
- Home stadium: Waldo Stadium

1977 Mid-American Conference football standings
	Conf.					Overall
Team	W		L		T	W		L		T
Miami (OH) $	5	–	0	–	0	10	–	1	–	0
Central Michigan	7	–	1	–	0	10	–	1	–	0
Ball State	5	–	1	–	0	9	–	2	–	0
Bowling Green	4	–	3	–	0	5	–	7	–	0
Eastern Michigan	4	–	3	–	0	8	–	3	–	0
Kent State	5	–	4	–	0	6	–	5	–	0
Western Michigan	3	–	5	–	0	4	–	7	–	0
Northern Illinois	2	–	5	–	0	3	–	8	–	0
Toledo	2	–	7	–	0	2	–	9	–	0
Ohio	0	–	8	–	0	1	–	10	–	0
$ – Conference champion

The 1977 Western Michigan Broncos football team represented Western Michigan University in the Mid-American Conference (MAC) during the 1977 NCAA Division I football season. In their third season under head coach Elliot Uzelac, the Broncos compiled a 4–7 record (3–5 against MAC opponents), finished in seventh place in the MAC, and outscored their opponents, 261 to 231. The team played its home games at Waldo Stadium in Kalamazoo, Michigan.

The team's statistical leaders included Albert Little with 802 passing yards, Jerome Persell with 1,339 rushing yards, and Craig Frazier with 319 receiving yards. Linebacker Howard Nevins and fullback Keith Rogien were the team captains. Tailback Jerome Persell received the team's most outstanding player award. Persell was also named MAC offensive player of the year for the second of what would be three consecutive years.

== Schedule ==
Date	Opponent	Site	Result	Attendance	Source
September 10	at Minnesota*	Memorial Stadium; Minneapolis, MN	L 7–10	29,619	
September 17	UT Arlington*	Waldo Stadium; Kalamazoo, MI	L 10–17	16,900	
September 24	Northern Illinois	Waldo Stadium; Kalamazoo, MI	W 37–6		
October 1	at Bowling Green	Doyt Perry Stadium; Bowling Green, OH	L 28–31		
October 8	Kent State	Waldo Stadium; Kalamazoo, MI	L 16–20		
October 15	at Toledo	Glass Bowl; Toledo, OH	W 34–21		
October 22	Marshall*	Waldo Stadium; Kalamazoo, MI	W 53–29	22,600	
October 29	at Ohio	Peden Stadium; Athens, OH	W 28–22	1,072	
November 5	Miami (OH)	Waldo Stadium; Kalamazoo, MI	L 8–14	21,800	
November 12	Ball State	Waldo Stadium; Kalamazoo, MI	L 25–29	10,500	
November 19	at Central Michigan	Perry Shorts Stadium; Mount Pleasant, MI (rivalry)	L 23–28	16,747	
*Non-conference game
