= 1977 All-Atlantic Coast Conference football team =

American college football all-star team

The 1977 All-Atlantic Coast Conference football team consists of American football players chosen by various selectors for their All-Atlantic Coast Conference ("ACC") teams for the 1977 college football season. Selectors in 1977 included the Associated Press (AP).

== Offensive selections ==
=== Tackles ===
- Lacy Brumley, Clemson (AP-1)
- John Patterson, Duke (AP-1)

=== Guards ===
- Joe Bostic, Clemson (AP-1)
- Mike Salzano, North Carolina (AP-1)

=== Centers ===
- Larry Tearry, Wake Forest (AP-1)

=== Tight ends ===
- Steve Young, Wake Forest (AP-1)

=== Split ends ===
- Jerry Butler, Clemson (AP-1)

=== Quarterbacks ===
- Steve Fuller, Clemson (AP-1)

=== Backs ===
- Ted Brown, NC State (AP-1)
- Amos Lawrence, North Carolina (AP-1)
- James McDougald, Wake Forest (AP-1)

== Defensive selections ==
=== Defensive linemen ===
- Dee Hardison, North Carolina (AP-1)
- Rod Broadway, North Carolina (AP-1)
- Ken Sheets, North Carolina (AP-1)
- Jon Brooks, Clemson (AP-1)
- Ted Klaube, Maryland (AP-1)

=== Linebackers ===
- Randy Scott, Clemson (AP-1)
- Buddy Curry, North Carolina (AP-1)

=== Defensive backs ===
- Alan Caldwell, North Carolina (AP-1)
- Steve Ryan, Clemson (AP-1)
- Rick Carter, NC State (AP-1)
- Ralph Stringer, NC State (AP-1)

== Special teams ==
=== Placekickers ===
- Russ Henderson, Virginia (AP-1)

== Key ==
AP = Associated Press

== See also ==
- 1977 College Football All-America Team
