= David Rothman (statistician) =

American statistician and public policy advisor

- Born: August 9, 1935; Bronx, New York, United States
- Died: June 12, 2004 (aged 68); Hawthorne, California, United States
- Occupations: Statistician, Public Policy

David Rothman (August 9, 1935 – June 12, 2004) was an American statistician, public policy advisor, and the creator of a computerized college football ranking system.

Rothman was the founder and executive director of the Foundation for the Analysis of Competitions and Tournaments (FACT), an organization and computer ranking used to select college football national champions.

The NCAA recognizes Rothman (FACT) as a "major selector" of college football national championships for the years 1968–2006. The Bowl Championship Series, for the 1999–2001 college football seasons, used FACT as one of the computer polls used to select participants for the BCS National Championship Game.

== Education and career ==
Rothman graduated from the University of Wisconsin.

Rothman spent many years working as a private-sector aerospace statistician for companies like Lockheed Corporation, Agbabian Associates, and Rocketdyne. Through Rocketdyne, he was part of the enormous scientific technical talent pool utilized by NASA to achieve the Apollo program Moon landing. Through Agbabian Associates, he was part of the scientific technical talent pool utilized by NASA to analyze the mechanical structure used in the space shuttle reloading facility called the Vehicle Assembly Building.

== College football rankings ==
According to Rothman, he first began ranking college football teams in 1963 using a precursory computer ranking formula. In the spring of 1970 or 1971 he developed the current ranking method used for FACT.

Rothman and his college football computer ranking system were discussed in a February 1968 issue of Time magazine.

In 1991 Sports Illustrated covered the bottom 10 teams on his list. At the time, the 0–6 Dr. Martin Luther College Lancers were ranked last out of 677 college football teams.

Rothman would eventually conduct his college football rankings as the executive director of the Foundation for the Analysis of Competitions and Tournaments (FACT), an organization he founded.

=== Bowl Championship Series ===
David Rothman's ranking system was a computerized mathematical ranking system fully developed by himself. It was unbiased and gained notice and popularity from Bowl Championship Series (BCS) administrators, his peers and the public. His system has the advantage that it was readily available to anyone who asked to use it, and it was nonproprietary.

Rothman would have liked his system to have been widely used in tournaments in college sports such as basketball and football, where standings of teams were available and coaches and schools could reproduce rankings quickly. This system only used the margin of the score and the name of the team to arrive at a ranking. He believed that the BCS organization could rely on his system because it was adequate and sufficient, and convinced them to use his system as one of the computer ranking systems used in determining their championship game participants.

In 2002, when the revised BCS rules required all participating computer rankings to remove any weighting toward margin of victory, Rothman opted to drop out of the BCS, rather than make the necessary changes in his system. Rothman's system by design was indirectly incorporating margin of victory. Rothman believed that it was evident that the success and validity of his system, which performed on a predictive basis, arose because he used the margin of victory as a factor.

== FACT National Champions ==
The Foundation for the Analysis of Competitions and Tournaments selected the following NCAA Division I college football national champions. The NCAA has designated FACT as one of its “major selectors” of national championship teams for the seasons of 1968 through 2006.

Season	Champion(s)	Record	Coach
1968	Ohio State	10–0	Woody Hayes
1969	Penn State	11–0	Joe Paterno
1969	Texas	11–0	Darrell Royal
1970	Nebraska	11–0–1	Bob Devaney
1970	Notre Dame	10–1	Ara Parseghian
1970	Texas	10–1	Darrell Royal
1971	Nebraska	13–0	Bob Devaney
1972	USC	12–0	John McKay
1973	Ohio State	10–0–1	Woody Hayes
1974	Oklahoma	11–0	Barry Switzer
1975	Ohio State	11–1	Woody Hayes
1975	Oklahoma	11–1	Barry Switzer
1976	Pittsburgh	12–0	Johnny Majors
1977	Arkansas	11–1	Lou Holtz
1977	Notre Dame	11–1	Dan Devine
1977	Texas	11–1	Fred Akers
1978	Alabama	11–1	Bear Bryant
1978	Oklahoma	11–1	Barry Switzer
1978	USC	12–1	John Robinson
1979	Alabama	12–0	Bear Bryant
1980	Florida State	10–2	Bobby Bowden
1980	Georgia	12–0	Vince Dooley
1980	Nebraska	10–2	Tom Osborne
1980	Pittsburgh	11–1	Jackie Sherrill
1981	Clemson	12–0	Danny Ford
1982	Penn State	11–1	Joe Paterno
1983	Auburn	11–1	Pat Dye
1983	Nebraska	12–1	Tom Osborne
1984	Florida	9–1–1	Galen Hall
1985	Oklahoma	11–1	Barry Switzer
1986	Miami	11–1	Jimmy Johnson
1986	Penn State	12–0	Joe Paterno
1987	Miami	12–0	Jimmy Johnson
1988	Notre Dame	12–0	Lou Holtz
1989	Miami	11–1	Dennis Erickson
1989	Notre Dame	12–1	Lou Holtz
1990	Colorado	11–1–1	Bill McCartney
1990	Georgia Tech	11–0–1	Bobby Ross
1990	Miami	10–2	Dennis Erickson
1990	Washington	10–2	Don James
1991	Washington	12–0	Don James
1992	Alabama	13–0	Gene Stallings
1993	Florida State	12–1	Bobby Bowden
1994	Nebraska	13–0	Tom Osborne
1994	Penn State	12–0	Joe Paterno
1995	Nebraska	12–0	Tom Osborne
1996	Florida	12–1	Steve Spurrier
1997	Nebraska	13–0	Tom Osborne
1998	Tennessee	13–0	Phillip Fulmer
1999^{BCS}	Florida State	12–0	Bobby Bowden
2000^{BCS}	Oklahoma	13–0	Bob Stoops
2001^{BCS}	Miami	12–0	Larry Coker
2002	Ohio State	14–0	Jim Tressel
2003	LSU	13–1	Nick Saban
2004	USC	11–0	Pete Carroll
2005	Texas	13–0	Mack Brown
2006	Florida	13–1	Urban Meyer
2006	Ohio State	12–1	Jim Tressel

^{BCS} Years in which FACT was incorporated into the Bowl Championship Series computer rankings.
