= 1977 Middle Tennessee Blue Raiders football team =

American college football season

1977 Middle Tennessee Blue Raiders football
- Conference: Ohio Valley Conference
- Record: 3–8 (3–4 OVC)
- Head coach: Ben Hurt (3rd season)
- Captains: Moore; Buck; Murphy
- Home stadium: Horace Jones Field

1977 Ohio Valley Conference football standings
	Conf.					Overall
Team	W		L		T	W		L		T
Austin Peay $	6	–	1	–	0	8	–	3	–	0
Tennessee Tech	5	–	2	–	0	9	–	2	–	0
Eastern Kentucky	4	–	3	–	0	5	–	5	–	0
Murray State	4	–	3	–	0	6	–	5	–	0
Middle Tennessee	3	–	4	–	0	3	–	8	–	0
Morehead State	2	–	4	–	1	2	–	6	–	2
East Tennessee State	2	–	5	–	0	3	–	8	–	0
Western Kentucky	1	–	5	–	1	1	–	8	–	1
$ – Conference champion

The 1977 Middle Tennessee Blue Raiders football team represented Middle Tennessee State University—as a member of the Ohio Valley Conference (OVC) during the 1977 NCAA Division II football season. Led by third-year head coach Ben Hurt, the Blue Raiders compiled a record an overall record of 3–8 with a mark of 3–4 in conference play. The team's captains were Moore, Buck, and Murphy.

== Schedule ==
Date	Opponent	Site	Result	Attendance	Source
September 3	vs. Tennessee State*	Dudley Field; Nashville, TN	L 0–27	17,500	
September 17	at Tennessee–Martin*	Pacer Stadium; Martin, TN	L 0–27	7,000	
September 24	at Morehead State	Jayne Stadium; Morehead, KY	L 21–24	6,000	
October 1	at Chattanooga*	Chamberlain Field; Chattanooga, TN	L 7–38	7,100	
October 8	Eastern Kentucky	Horace Jones Field; Murfreesboro, TN	W 19–10	2,000	
October 15	Murray State	Horace Jones Field; Murfreesboro, TN	L 9–13	9,500	
October 22	at Delaware*	Delaware Stadium; Newark, DE	L 7–60	16,479	
October 29	at Austin Peay	Clarksville Municipal Stadium; Clarksville, TN	W 15–6	10,200	
November 5	Western Kentucky	Horace Jones Field; Murfreesboro, TN (rivalry)	W 21–19	2,800	
November 12	at East Tennessee State	Memorial Center; Johnson City, TN	L 17–38	6,500	
November 19	Tennessee Tech	Horace Jones Field; Murfreesboro, TN	L 9–21	7,800	
*Non-conference game

== After the season ==
=== NFL draft ===
The following Blue Raider was selected in the 1978 NFL draft following the season.

Round	Pick	Player	Position	NFL club
12	331	Mike Moore	Running back	Miami Dolphins
