= 1977 Kent State Golden Flashes football team =

American college football season

1977 Kent State Golden Flashes football
- Conference: Mid-American Conference
- Record: 6–5 (5–4 MAC)
- Head coach: Dennis Fitzgerald (3rd season)
- Offensive coordinator: Ron Blackledge (1st season)
- Home stadium: Dix Stadium

1977 Mid-American Conference football standings
	Conf.					Overall
Team	W		L		T	W		L		T
Miami (OH) $	5	–	0	–	0	10	–	1	–	0
Central Michigan	7	–	1	–	0	10	–	1	–	0
Ball State	5	–	1	–	0	9	–	2	–	0
Bowling Green	4	–	3	–	0	5	–	7	–	0
Eastern Michigan	4	–	3	–	0	8	–	3	–	0
Kent State	5	–	4	–	0	6	–	5	–	0
Western Michigan	3	–	5	–	0	4	–	7	–	0
Northern Illinois	2	–	5	–	0	3	–	8	–	0
Toledo	2	–	7	–	0	2	–	9	–	0
Ohio	0	–	8	–	0	1	–	10	–	0
$ – Conference champion

The 1977 Kent State Golden Flashes football team was an American football team that represented Kent State University in the Mid-American Conference (MAC) during the 1977 NCAA Division I football season. In their third and final season under head coach Dennis Fitzgerald, the Golden Flashes compiled a 6–5 record (5–4 against MAC opponents), finished in sixth place in the MAC, and were outscored by all opponents by a combined total of 241 to 200.

The team's statistical leaders included Tom Roper with 630 rushing yards, Mike Whalen with 534 passing yards, and Kim Featsent with 549 receiving yards. Five Kent State players were selected as first-team All-MAC players: wide receiver Kim Featsent, offensive tackle Tom Jesko, linebacker Jack Lazor, placekicker Paul Marchese, and defensive lineman Mike Zele.

Dennis Fitzgerald resigned as Kent State's head coach in March 1978 to accept a position as an assistant coach at Syracuse. In three years as Kent State's head coach, he compiled an 18–16 record.

== Schedule ==
Date	Opponent	Site	Result	Attendance	Source
September 10	Illinois State*	Dix Stadium; Kent, OH	W 33–14	7,796	
September 17	at No. 12 Colorado*	Folsom Field; Boulder, CO	L 0–42	46,164	
September 24	Ball State	Dix Stadium; Kent, OH	W 13–12		
October 1	at Ohio	Peden Stadium; Athens, OH	W 44–23		
October 8	at Western Michigan	Waldo Stadium; Kalamazoo, MI	W 20–16		
October 15	Bowling Green	Dix Stadium; Kent, OH (rivalry)	L 10–14		
October 22	at Eastern Michigan	Rynearson Stadium; Ypsilanti, MI	W 29–13		
October 29	Northern Illinois	Dix Stadium; Kent, OH	L 18–21		
November 5	Central Michigan	Dix Stadium; Kent, OH	L 10–49		
November 12	Miami (OH)	Dix Stadium; Kent, OH	L 0–25	5,421	
November 19	at Toledo	Glass Bowl; Toledo, OH	W 23–12	6,782	
*Non-conference game; Rankings from AP Poll released prior to the game
