= 1977 East Tennessee State Buccaneers football team =

American college football season

1977 East Tennessee State Buccaneers football
- Conference: Ohio Valley Conference
- Record: 3–8 (2–5 OVC)
- Head coach: Roy Frazier (5th season)
- Home stadium: Memorial Center

1977 Ohio Valley Conference football standings
	Conf.					Overall
Team	W		L		T	W		L		T
Austin Peay $	6	–	1	–	0	8	–	3	–	0
Tennessee Tech	5	–	2	–	0	9	–	2	–	0
Eastern Kentucky	4	–	3	–	0	5	–	5	–	0
Murray State	4	–	3	–	0	6	–	5	–	0
Middle Tennessee	3	–	4	–	0	3	–	8	–	0
Morehead State	2	–	4	–	1	2	–	6	–	2
East Tennessee State	2	–	5	–	0	3	–	8	–	0
Western Kentucky	1	–	5	–	1	1	–	8	–	1
$ – Conference champion

The 1977 East Tennessee State Buccaneers football team represented East Tennessee State University as a member of the Ohio Valley Conference (OVC) during the 1977 NCAA Division II football season. Led by fifth-year head coach Roy Frazier, the Buccaneers compiled an overall record of 3–8, with a mark of 2–5 in conference play, and finished seventh in the OVC.

== Schedule ==
Date	Opponent	Site	Result	Attendance	Source
September 10	North Alabama*	Memorial Center; Johnson City, TN	L 21–37	8,000	
September 17	at Furman*	Sirrine Stadium; Greenville, SC	L 12–42	13,000	
September 24	Eastern Kentucky	Memorial Center; Johnson City, TN	L 34–38	8,500	
October 1	at Western Kentucky	L. T. Smith Stadium; Bowling Green, KY	L 13–33	10,500	
October 8	Appalachian State*	Memorial Center; Johnson City, TN	W 38–20	8,500	
October 15	at Western Carolina*	E. J. Whitmire Stadium; Cullowhee, NC	L 0–35	7,800	
October 22	Murray State^{†}	Memorial Center; Johnson City, TN	L 10–13	9,000	
October 29	at Tennessee Tech	Tucker Stadium; Cookeville, TN	L 20–63	6,500	
November 5	at Morehead State	Jayne Stadium; Morehead, KY	W 37–34	6,500	
November 12	Middle Tennessee	Memorial Center; Johnson City, TN	W 38–17	6,500	
November 19	at Austin Peay	Municipal Stadium; Clarksville, TN	L 10–24	8,500	
*Non-conference game; ^{†}Homecoming; Source:
