= 1977 Maryland Terrapins football team =

American college football season

1977 Maryland Terrapins football

Hall of Fame Classic, W 17–7 vs. Minnesota
- Conference: Atlantic Coast Conference
- Record: 8–4 (4–2 ACC)
- Head coach: Jerry Claiborne (6th season)
- Home stadium: Byrd Stadium

1977 Atlantic Coast Conference football standings
| | Conf. | | | | | Overall |
| Team | W | | L | | T | W | | L | | T |
|---|---|---|---|---|---|---|---|---|---|---|
| No. 17 North Carolina $ | 5 | – | 0 | – | 1 | 8 | – | 3 | – | 1 |
| No. 19 Clemson | 4 | – | 1 | – | 1 | 8 | – | 3 | – | 1 |
| NC State | 4 | – | 2 | – | 0 | 8 | – | 4 | – | 0 |
| Maryland | 4 | – | 2 | – | 0 | 8 | – | 4 | – | 0 |
| Duke | 2 | – | 4 | – | 0 | 5 | – | 6 | – | 0 |
| Virginia | 1 | – | 5 | – | 0 | 1 | – | 9 | – | 1 |
| Wake Forest | 0 | – | 6 | – | 0 | 1 | – | 10 | – | 0 |
$ – Conference champion; Rankings from AP Poll

The 1977 Maryland Terrapins football team represented the University of Maryland in the 1977 NCAA Division I football season. In their sixth season under head coach Jerry Claiborne, the Terrapins compiled an 8–4 record (4–2 in conference), finished in a tie for third place in the Atlantic Coast Conference, and outscored their opponents 254 to 179. The team ended its season with a 17–7 victory over Minnesota in the Hall of Fame Classic. The team's statistical leaders included Larry Dick with 1,351 passing yards, George Scott with 894 rushing yards, and Vince Kinney with 505 receiving yards.

== Schedule ==
| Date | Opponent | Rank | Site | Result | Attendance | Source |
|---|---|---|---|---|---|---|
| September 10 | at Clemson | No. 10 | Memorial Stadium; Clemson, SC | W 21–14 | 34,650 | |
| September 17 | West Virginia* | No. 11 | Byrd Stadium; College Park, MD (rivalry) | L 16–24 | 45,123 | |
| September 24 | at No. 5 Penn State* | | Beaver Stadium; University Park, PA (rivalry) | L 9–27 | 62,079 | |
| October 1 | at NC State | | Carter Stadium; Raleigh, NC | L 20–24 | 42,800 | |
| October 8 | Syracuse* | | Byrd Stadium; College Park, MD | W 24–10 | 39,100 | |
| October 15 | at Wake Forest | | Groves Stadium; Winston-Salem, NC | W 35–7 | 24,900 | |
| October 22 | Duke | | Byrd Stadium; College Park, MD | W 31–13 | 44,867 | |
| October 29 | North Carolina | | Byrd Stadium; College Park, MD | L 7–16 | 42,683 | |
| November 5 | Villanova* | | Byrd Stadium; College Park, MD | W 19–13 | 30,186 | |
| November 12 | at Richmond* | | City Stadium; Richmond, VA | W 27–24 | 17,000 | |
| November 19 | Virginia | | Byrd Stadium; College Park, MD (rivalry) | W 28–0 | 33,787 | |
| December 22 | vs. Minnesota* | | Legion Field; Birmingham, AL (Hall of Fame Classic) | W 17–7 | 47,000 | |
*Non-conference game; Rankings from AP Poll released prior to the game

== Roster ==
1977 Maryland Terrapins football team roster
Players
Coaches
Offense

| Pos. | # | Name | Class |
|---|---|---|---|
| RB | 38 | Steve Atkins | Jr |
| WR | 22 | Jim Hagan | So |
| WR | | Vince Kinney | Sr |
| QB | 13 | Mark Manges | Sr |
| TE | 85 | Eric Sievers | So |

Defense

| Pos. | # | Name | Class |
|---|---|---|---|
| LB | 46 | Brad Carr | Sr |
| DT | 99 | Charles Johnson | Jr |

Special teams

| Pos. | # | Name | Class |

Head coach

- Jerry Claiborne

Coordinators/assistant coaches

Legend

- (C) Team captain
- (S) Suspended
- (I) Ineligible
- Injured
- Redshirt
