= 1977 VMI Keydets football team =

American college football season

1977 VMI Keydets football

SoCon co-champion
- Conference: Southern Conference
- Record: 7–4 (4–1 SoCon)
- Head coach: Bob Thalman (7th season)
- Home stadium: Alumni Memorial Field

1977 Southern Conference football standings
	Conf.					Overall
Team	W		L		T	W		L		T
Chattanooga +	4	–	1	–	0	9	–	1	–	1
VMI +	4	–	1	–	0	7	–	4	–	0
The Citadel	3	–	2	–	0	5	–	6	–	0
Furman	3	–	2	–	1	4	–	5	–	2
Western Carolina	2	–	2	–	1	6	–	4	–	1
Appalachian State	1	–	4	–	0	2	–	9	–	0
Marshall	0	–	5	–	0	2	–	9	–	0
Davidson	0	–	0	–	0	4	–	6	–	0
+ – Conference co-champions; VMI's games against William & Mary, East Carolina, and Richmond and Marshall's game against Louisville were designated as conference games and counted in the SoCon standings.

The 1977 VMI Keydets football team was an American football team that represented the Virginia Military Institute (VMI) as a member of the Southern Conference (SoCon) during the 1977 NCAA Division I football season. In their seventh year under head coach Bob Thalman, the Keydets compiled an overall record of 7–4 with a mark of 4–1 in conference play, sharing the SoCon title with Chattanooga.

== Schedule ==
Date	Opponent	Site	Result	Attendance	Source
September 10	William & Mary (Note: VMI's games against William & Mary, East Carolina, and Richmond were designated as conference games and counted in the SoCon standings.)	Alumni Memorial Field; Lexington, VA	W 23–13	8,100	
September 17	at Army*	Michie Stadium; West Point, NY	L 14–27	26,664	
September 24	at East Carolina	Ficklen Stadium; Greenville, NC	L 13–14	23,581	
October 8	Richmond	Alumni Memorial Field; Lexington, VA	W 25–0	6,800	
October 15	The Citadel	Alumni Memorial Field; Lexington, VA	W 19–3	8,700	
October 22	at Lehigh*	Taylor Stadium; Bethlehem, PA	L 20–30	13,000	
October 29	Davidson*	Alumni Memorial Field; Lexington, VA	W 21–0	4,700	
November 5	at Virginia*	Scott Stadium; Charlottesville, VA	W 30–6	21,000	
November 12	at Furman	Sirrine Stadium; Greenville, SC	W 31–28	10,000	
November 19	Rhode Island*	Alumni Memorial Field; Lexington, VA	W 20–7	5,200	
November 26	at Virginia Tech*	Lane Stadium; Blacksburg, VA	L 7–27	10,000	
*Non-conference game
