= 1977 NC State Wolfpack football team =

American college football season

1977 NC State Wolfpack football

Peach Bowl, W 24–14 vs. Iowa State
- Conference: Atlantic Coast Conference

Ranking
- Coaches: No. 19
- Record: 8–4 (4–2 ACC)
- Head coach: Bo Rein (2nd season)
- Home stadium: Carter Stadium

1977 Atlantic Coast Conference football standings
	Conf.					Overall
Team	W		L		T	W		L		T
No. 17 North Carolina $	5	–	0	–	1	8	–	3	–	1
No. 19 Clemson	4	–	1	–	1	8	–	3	–	1
NC State	4	–	2	–	0	8	–	4	–	0
Maryland	4	–	2	–	0	8	–	4	–	0
Duke	2	–	4	–	0	5	–	6	–	0
Virginia	1	–	5	–	0	1	–	9	–	1
Wake Forest	0	–	6	–	0	1	–	10	–	0
$ – Conference champion; Rankings from AP Poll

The 1977 NC State Wolfpack football team represented the North Carolina State Wolfpack during the 1977 NCAA Division I football season. The team's head coach was Bo Rein. NC State has been a member of the Atlantic Coast Conference (ACC) since the league's inception in 1953. The Wolfpack played its home games in 1977 at Carter Stadium in Raleigh, North Carolina, which has been NC State football's home stadium since 1966.

== Schedule ==
Date	Opponent	Site	TV	Result	Attendance	Source
September 3	East Carolina*	Carter Stadium; Raleigh, NC (rivalry)		L 23–28	49,200	
September 10	Virginia	Carter Stadium; Raleigh, NC		W 14–0	38,800	
September 17	at Syracuse*	Archbold Stadium; Syracuse, NY		W 38–0	20,696	
September 24	Wake Forest	Carter Stadium; Raleigh, NC (rivalry)		W 41–14	45,500	
October 1	Maryland	Carter Stadium; Raleigh, NC		W 24–20	42,800	
October 8	at Auburn*	Jordan–Hare Stadium; Auburn, AL		W 17–15	45,000	
October 15	North Carolina	Carter Stadium; Raleigh, NC (rivalry)		L 14–27	51,300	
October 22	at No. 20 Clemson	Memorial Stadium; Clemson, SC (rivalry)		L 3–7	50,304	
October 29	South Carolina*	Carter Stadium; Raleigh, NC		W 7–3	40,800	
November 5	No. 9 Penn State*	Carter Stadium; Raleigh, NC		L 17–21	44,800	
November 12	at Duke	Wallace Wade Stadium; Durham, NC (rivalry)		W 37–32	28,350	
December 31	vs. Iowa State*	Atlanta–Fulton County Stadium; Atlanta, GA (Peach Bowl)	MTN	W 24–14	37,733	
*Non-conference game; Rankings from AP Poll released prior to the game
