= 1977 Texas Longhorns football team =

American college football season

1977 Texas Longhorns football

Co-national champion (Rothman (FACT)) SWC champion

Cotton Bowl Classic, L 10–38 vs. Notre Dame
- Conference: Southwest Conference

Ranking
- Coaches: No. 5
- AP: No. 4
- Record: 11–1 (8–0 SWC)
- Head coach: Fred Akers (1st season)
- Offensive coordinator: Leon Manley (1st season)
- Offensive scheme: Veer, I formation
- Defensive coordinator: Leon Fuller (1st season)
- Base defense: 4–3
- Captains: Earl Campbell; Morgan Cope; George James; Brad Shearer
- Home stadium: Texas Memorial Stadium

1977 Southwest Conference football standings
| | Conf. | | | | | Overall |
| Team | W | | L | | T | W | | L | | T |
|---|---|---|---|---|---|---|---|---|---|---|
| No. 4 Texas $ | 8 | – | 0 | – | 0 | 11 | – | 1 | – | 0 |
| No. 3 Arkansas | 7 | – | 1 | – | 0 | 11 | – | 1 | – | 0 |
| Texas A&M | 6 | – | 2 | – | 0 | 8 | – | 4 | – | 0 |
| Houston | 4 | – | 4 | – | 0 | 6 | – | 5 | – | 0 |
| Texas Tech | 4 | – | 4 | – | 0 | 7 | – | 5 | – | 0 |
| Baylor | 3 | – | 5 | – | 0 | 5 | – | 6 | – | 0 |
| SMU | 3 | – | 5 | – | 0 | 4 | – | 7 | – | 0 |
| TCU | 1 | – | 7 | – | 0 | 2 | – | 9 | – | 0 |
| Rice | 0 | – | 8 | – | 0 | 1 | – | 10 | – | 0 |
$ – Conference champion; Rankings from AP Poll

The 1977 Texas Longhorns football team represented the University of Texas at Austin in the 1977 NCAA Division I football season. The Longhorns finished the regular season with an 11–0 record. Earl Campbell won the Heisman Trophy in 1977 and led the nation in rushing with 1,744 yards. In 1977, he became the first recipient of the Davey O'Brien Memorial Trophy, which was awarded to the most outstanding player in the now-defunct Southwest Conference. He was selected as the Southwest Conference running back of the year in each of his college seasons and finished with 4,444 career rushing yards. Rothman (FACT), a mathematical rating system in use since 1968 and NCAA-designated major selector, selected Texas as co-national champions with Notre Dame and Arkansas.

== Schedule ==
| Date | Time | Opponent | Rank | Site | TV | Result | Attendance | Source |
|---|---|---|---|---|---|---|---|---|
| September 10 | 4:00 p.m. | Boston College* | No. 18 | Texas Memorial Stadium; Austin, TX | | W 44–0 | 50,000 | |
| September 17 | 4:00 p.m. | Virginia* | No. 9 | Texas Memorial Stadium; Austin, TX | | W 68–0 | 41,000 | |
| October 1 | 4:00 p.m. | Rice | No. 8 | Texas Memorial Stadium; Austin, TX (rivalry) | | W 72–15 | 47,500 | |
| October 8 | 2:00 p.m. | vs. No. 2 Oklahoma* | No. 5 | Cotton Bowl; Dallas, TX (Red River Shootout) | | W 13–6 | 72,032 | |
| October 15 | 12:00 p.m. | at No. 8 Arkansas | No. 2 | Razorback Stadium; Fayetteville, AR (rivalry) | ABC | W 13–9 | 44,296 | |
| October 22 | 1:30 p.m. | at SMU | No. 2 | Cotton Bowl; Dallas, TX | | W 30–14 | 36,151 | |
| October 29 | 2:00 p.m. | No. 14 Texas Tech | No. 1 | Texas Memorial Stadium; Austin, TX (rivalry) | | W 26–0 | 78,809 | |
| November 5 | 2:00 p.m. | at Houston | No. 1 | Rice Stadium; Houston, TX | | W 35–21 | 72,124 | |
| November 12 | 2:00 p.m. | TCU | No. 1 | Texas Memorial Stadium; Austin, TX (rivalry) | | W 44–14 | 50,150 | |
| November 19 | 3:00 p.m. | Baylor | No. 1 | Texas Memorial Stadium; Austin, TX (rivalry) | ABC | W 29–7 | 60,000 | |
| November 26 | 1:30 p.m. | at No. 12 Texas A&M | No. 1 | Kyle Field; College Station, TX (rivalry) | | W 57–28 | 57,443 | |
| January 2, 1978 | 1:00 p.m. | vs. No. 5 Notre Dame* | No. 1 | Cotton Bowl; Dallas, TX (Cotton Bowl Classic) | CBS | L 10–38 | 76,701 | |
*Non-conference game; Rankings from AP Poll released prior to the game; All times are in Central time; Source:

== Game summaries ==
=== Oklahoma ===
#2 Oklahoma vs. #5 Texas

| Team | 1 | 2 | 3 | 4 | Total |
|---|---|---|---|---|---|
| Sooners | 3 | 0 | 3 | 0 | 6 |
| • Longhorns | 0 | 10 | 0 | 3 | 13 |

- Date: October 9
- Location: Cotton Bowl
- Game attendance: 72,000

Scoring summary
| Q1 | OKLA | von Schamann 47 yard field goal | OKLA 3–0 |
| Q2 | TEX | Erxleben 64 yard field goal | Tie 3–3 |
| Q2 | TEX | Campbell 24 yard run (Erxleben kick) | TEX 10–3 |
| Q3 | OKLA | von Schamann 33 yard field goal | TEX 10–6 |
| Q4 | TEX | Erxleben 58 yard field goal | TEX 13–6 |

=== At Texas A&M ===
#1 Texas at Texas A&M

| Team | 1 | 2 | 3 | 4 | Total |
|---|---|---|---|---|---|
| • Longhorns | 14 | 19 | 7 | 17 | 57 |
| Aggies | 7 | 7 | 14 | 0 | 28 |

- Date: November 26
- Location: Kyle Field, College Station, Texas
- Game attendance: 57,443

Scoring summary
| Q1 | TA&M | Dickey 7 yard run (Franklin kick) | TA&M 7–0 |
| Q1 | TEX | Campbell 60 yard pass from McEachern (McMichael kick) | Tie 7–7 |
| Q1 | TEX | Campbell 4 yard run (McMichael kick) | TEX 14–7 |
| Q2 | TEX | H. Jones 4 yard run (McMichael kick) | TEX 21–7 |
| Q2 | TEX | Jackson 9 yard pass from McEachern (kick failed) | TEX 26–7 |
| Q2 | TEX | Jackson 12 yard pass from McEachern (McMichael kick) | TEX 33–7 |
| Q2 | TA&M | Woodard 1 yard run (Franklin kick) | TEX 33–14 |
| Q3 | TEX | Campbell 6 yard run (McMichael kick) | TEX 40–14 |
| Q3 | TA&M | Walker 8 yard run (Franklin kick) | TEX 40–21 |
| Q3 | TA&M | Woodard 1 yard run (Franklin kick) | TEX 40–28 |
| Q4 | TEX | Campbell 23 yard run (McMichael kick) | TEX 47–28 |
| Q4 | TEX | L. Jones 37 yard pass from McEachern (McMichael kick) | TEX 54–28 |
| Q4 | TEX | McMichael 48 yard field goal | TEX 57–28 |

- Earl Campbell 27 Rush, 222 Yds (career-high)

=== vs. Notre Dame (Cotton Bowl) ===
| Team | 1 | 2 | 3 | 4 | Total |
|---|---|---|---|---|---|
| • Fighting Irish | 3 | 21 | 7 | 7 | 38 |
| Longhorns | 3 | 7 | 0 | 0 | 10 |

- Date: January 2
- Location: Cotton Bowl
- Game attendance: 76,701
- Game weather: Sunny; 35 °F (2 °C)
- Referee: Vance Carlson
- TV announcers (CBS): Lindsey Nelson, Paul Hornung, Paul Alexander, and Don Criqui

Scoring summary
| Q1 | 11:35 | ND | Reeve 47-yard field goal | ND 3–0 |
| Q1 | 6:07 | TEX | Erxleben 42-yard field goal | Tie 3–3 |
| Q2 | 14:56 | ND | Eurick 6-yard run (Reeve kick) | ND 10–3 |
| Q2 | 11:37 | ND | Eurick 10-yard run (Reeve kick) | ND 17–3 |
| Q2 | 7:28 | ND | Ferguson 17-yard pass from Montana (Reeve kick) | ND 24–3 |
| Q2 | 0:00 | TEX | Lockett 13-yard pass from McEachern (Erxeleben kick) | ND 24–10 |
| Q3 | 6:49 | ND | Ferguson 3-yard run (Reeve kick) | ND 31–10 |
| Q4 | 9:41 | ND | Ferguson 26-yard run (Reeve kick) | ND 38–10 |

== Roster ==
1977 Texas Longhorns football team roster
Players
Coaches
Offense

| Pos. | # | Name | Class |
|---|---|---|---|
| RB | 20 | Earl Campbell | Sr |
| WR | 2 | Alfred Jackson | Sr |
| WR | 26 | Lam Jones | So |
| QB | 6 | Randy McEachern | Jr |
| G | 76 | Jim Yarbrough | Sr |

Defense

| Pos. | # | Name | Class |
|---|---|---|---|
| DT | 99 | Steve McMichael | So |
| DL | 77 | Brad Shearer | Sr |

Special teams

| Pos. | # | Name | Class |
|---|---|---|---|
| K | 15 | Russell Erxleben | Jr |

Head coach

- Fred Akers

Coordinators/assistant coaches

Legend

- (C) Team captain
- (S) Suspended
- (I) Ineligible
- Injured
- Redshirt

== Awards and honors ==
- Earl Campbell – Heisman Trophy, Davey O'Brien Memorial Trophy, Consensus All-American
- Brad Shearer – Outland Trophy, Consensus All-American
- Fred Akers – SWC Coach of the Year

== 1977 team players in the NFL ==
The following players were drafted into professional football following the season.

| Player | Position | Round | Pick | Franchise |
|---|---|---|---|---|
| Earl Campbell | Running back | 1 | 1 | Houston Oilers |
| Brad Shearer | Defensive tackle | 3 | 74 | Chicago Bears |
| Alfred Jackson | Wide receiver | 7 | 167 | Atlanta Falcons |
