= 1977 Virginia Cavaliers football team =

American college football season

1977 Virginia Cavaliers football
- Conference: Atlantic Coast Conference
- Record: 1–9–1 (1–5 ACC)
- Head coach: Dick Bestwick (2nd season)
- Offensive coordinator: Brian Burke (1st season)
- Captain: Samuel Pfabe
- Home stadium: Scott Stadium

1977 Atlantic Coast Conference football standings
	Conf.					Overall
Team	W		L		T	W		L		T
No. 17 North Carolina $	5	–	0	–	1	8	–	3	–	1
No. 19 Clemson	4	–	1	–	1	8	–	3	–	1
NC State	4	–	2	–	0	8	–	4	–	0
Maryland	4	–	2	–	0	8	–	4	–	0
Duke	2	–	4	–	0	5	–	6	–	0
Virginia	1	–	5	–	0	1	–	9	–	1
Wake Forest	0	–	6	–	0	1	–	10	–	0
$ – Conference champion; Rankings from AP Poll

The 1977 Virginia Cavaliers football team represented the University of Virginia during the 1977 NCAA Division I football season. The Cavaliers were led by second-year head coach Dick Bestwick and played their home games at Scott Stadium in Charlottesville, Virginia. They competed as members of the Atlantic Coast Conference, finishing in sixth.

== Schedule ==
Date	Opponent	Site	Result	Attendance	Source
September 10	at NC State	Carter Stadium; Raleigh, NC	L 0–14	38,800	
September 17	at No. 18 Texas*	Texas Memorial Stadium; Austin, TX	L 0–68	41,000	
September 24	Duke^{†}	Scott Stadium; Charlottesville, VA	L 7–31	26,000	
October 1	West Virginia*	Scott Stadium; Charlottesville, VA	L 0–13	21,500	
October 8	at Clemson	Memorial Stadium; Clemson, SC	L 0–31	49,830–50,066	
October 15	at Virginia Tech*	Lane Stadium; Blacksburg, VA (rivalry)	T 14–14	40,000	
October 22	Wake Forest	Scott Stadium; Charlottesville, VA	W 12–10	21,500	
October 29	at Syracuse*	Archbold Stadium; Syracuse, NY	L 3–6	20,859	
November 5	VMI*	Scott Stadium; Charlottesville, VA	L 6–30	21,000	
November 12	No. 19 North Carolina	Scott Stadium; Charlottesville, VA (South's Oldest Rivalry)	L 14–35	21,000	
November 19	at Maryland	Byrd Stadium; College Park, MD (rivalry)	L 0–28	33,787	
*Non-conference game; ^{†}Homecoming; Rankings from AP Poll released prior to the game

== Roster ==
1977 Virginia Cavaliers football team roster
Players
Coaches
Offense

Pos.	#	Name	Class
G	74	John Choma	Sr

Defense

Pos.	#	Name	Class
SS	31	Tony Blount	So
LB	90	Steve Potter	So

Special teams

Pos.	#	Name	Class

Head coach

- Dick Bestwick

Coordinators/assistant coaches

Legend

- (C) Team captain
- (S) Suspended
- (I) Ineligible
- Injured
- Redshirt
