= 1977 SMU Mustangs football team =

American college football season

1977 SMU Mustangs football
- Conference: Southwest Conference
- Record: 4–7 (3–5 SWC)
- Head coach: Ron Meyer (2nd season)
- Offensive scheme: Wishbone
- Defensive coordinator: Steve Sidwell (2nd season)
- Base defense: 3–4
- Home stadium: Cotton Bowl

1977 Southwest Conference football standings
	Conf.					Overall
Team	W		L		T	W		L		T
No. 4 Texas $	8	–	0	–	0	11	–	1	–	0
No. 3 Arkansas	7	–	1	–	0	11	–	1	–	0
Texas A&M	6	–	2	–	0	8	–	4	–	0
Houston	4	–	4	–	0	6	–	5	–	0
Texas Tech	4	–	4	–	0	7	–	5	–	0
Baylor	3	–	5	–	0	5	–	6	–	0
SMU	3	–	5	–	0	4	–	7	–	0
TCU	1	–	7	–	0	2	–	9	–	0
Rice	0	–	8	–	0	1	–	10	–	0
$ – Conference champion; Rankings from AP Poll

The 1977 SMU Mustangs football team represented Southern Methodist University (SMU) as a member of the Southwest Conference (SWC) during the 1977 NCAA Division I football season. Led by second-year head coach Ron Meyer, the Mustangs compiled an overall record of 4–7 with a mark of 3–5 in conference play, tying for sixth place in the SWC.

== Schedule ==
Date	Opponent	Site	Result	Attendance	Source
September 10	at TCU	Amon G. Carter Stadium; Fort Worth, TX (rivalry)	W 45–21	19,576	
September 17	vs. North Texas State*	Texas Stadium; Irving, TX (rivalry)	L 13–24	26,097	
September 24	Tulane*	Cotton Bowl; Dallas, TX	W 28–23	18,460	
October 1	No. 6 Ohio State*	Cotton Bowl; Dallas, TX	L 7–35	51,970	
October 8	at Baylor	Baylor Stadium; Waco, TX	L 6–9	30,300	
October 15	at No. 19 Houston	Houston Astrodome; Houston, TX (rivalry)	W 37–23	30,774	
October 22	No. 2 Texas	Cotton Bowl; Dallas, TX	L 14–30	36,151	
October 29	at No. 11 Texas A&M	Kyle Field; College Station, TX	L 21–38	53,932	
November 5	Rice	Cotton Bowl; Dallas, TX (rivalry)	W 41–24	6,918	
November 12	No. 18 Texas Tech	Cotton Bowl; Dallas, TX	L 7–45	21,689	
November 19	at No. 8 Arkansas	Razorback Stadium; Fayetteville, AR	L 7–47	43,791	
*Non-conference game; Rankings from AP Poll released prior to the game

== Roster ==
1977 SMU Mustangs football team roster
Players
Coaches
Offense

Pos.	#	Name	Class
TE	87	Bob Fisher	So
QB	10	Mike Ford	Fr
OL	71	Mike Jusko	Fr
OL	67	Mike Mason	Fr
WR	21	Emanuel Tolbert	So
R	81	Gene Ratliff	Jr
OL	76	Lee Spivey	Fr
RB	40	Arthur Whittington	Sr
RB	33	Walt Foster	Jr

Defense

Pos.	#	Name	Class
DB	27	Charles Bruton	Fr
DB	9	Mark Gibson	Fr
DB	12	James Mobley	Fr
DL	80	Byron Hunt	Fr
DL	61	Charles Hunt	So

Special teams

Pos.	#	Name	Class

Head coach

- Ron Meyer

Coordinators/assistant coaches

Legend

- (C) Team captain
- (S) Suspended
- (I) Ineligible
- Injured
- Redshirt

== Team players in the NFL ==
Player	Position	Round	Pick	NFL club
Arthur Whittington	Running back	7	176	Oakland Raiders
