= 1977 Appalachian State Mountaineers football team =

American college football season

1977 Appalachian State Mountaineers football
- Conference: Southern Conference
- Record: 2–9 (1–4 SoCon)
- Head coach: Jim Brakefield (7th season)
- Home stadium: Conrad Stadium

1977 Southern Conference football standings
	Conf.					Overall
Team	W		L		T	W		L		T
Chattanooga +	4	–	1	–	0	9	–	1	–	1
VMI +	4	–	1	–	0	7	–	4	–	0
The Citadel	3	–	2	–	0	5	–	6	–	0
Furman	3	–	2	–	1	4	–	5	–	2
Western Carolina	2	–	2	–	1	6	–	4	–	1
Appalachian State	1	–	4	–	0	2	–	9	–	0
Marshall	0	–	5	–	0	2	–	9	–	0
Davidson	0	–	0	–	0	4	–	6	–	0
+ – Conference co-champions; VMI's games against William & Mary, East Carolina, and Richmond and Marshall's game against Louisville were designated as conference games and counted in the SoCon standings.

The 1977 Appalachian State Mountaineers football team was an American football team that represented Appalachian State University as a member of the Southern Conference (SoCon) during the 1977 NCAA Division I football season. In their seventh year under head coach Jim Brakefield, the Mountaineers compiled an overall record of 2–9 with a mark of 1–4 in conference play, finishing sixth in the SoCon.

== Schedule ==
Date	Opponent	Site	Result	Attendance	Source
September 3	at South Carolina*	Williams–Brice Stadium; Columbia, SC	L 17–32	50,114	
September 17	Chattanooga	Conrad Stadium; Boone, NC	L 7–14	12,230	
September 24	at Richmond*	City Stadium; Richmond, VA	L 13–21	13,000	
October 1	Marshall	Conrad Stadium; Boone, NC (rivalry)	W 28–20	10,150	
October 8	at East Tennessee State*	Memorial Center; Johnson City, TN	L 20–38	8,500	
October 15	Lenoir Rhyne*	Conrad Stadium; Boone, NC	W 35–21	10,420	
October 22	at Furman	Sirrine Stadium; Greenville, SC	L 20–28	9,500	
October 29	Ball State*	Conrad Stadium; Boone, NC	L 7–38	12,813	
November 5	East Carolina*	Conrad Stadium; Boone, NC	L 14–45	10,419	
November 12	at The Citadel	Johnson Hagood Stadium; Charleston, SC	L 20–28	10,420	
November 19	at Western Carolina	Whitmire Stadium; Cullowhee, NC (rivalry)	L 14–44	12,015	
*Non-conference game
