= Howard Sampson =

NFL American football player (born 1956)

No. 36
- Position: Defensive back

Personal information
- Born: July 7, 1956 (age 70); Baytown, Texas, U.S.
- Listed height: 5 ft 10 in (1.78 m)
- Listed weight: 185 lb (84 kg)

Career information
- High school: Sterling Baytown (TX)
- College: Arkansas
- NFL draft: 1978: undrafted

Career history
- Green Bay Packers (1978–1979)

Career NFL statistics
- Kick returns: 4
- Return yards: 68
- Stats at Pro Football Reference

Howard Sampson (born July 7, 1956) is a former defensive back in the National Football League (NFL). He played two seasons with the Green Bay Packers.

== Civic Leadership ==
Howard Sampson was appointed to the Goose Creek CISD Board of Trustees in August 2009. Sampson attended school in this district, graduating in 1974 from Ross S. Sterling High School, where he played football. Goose Creek Consolidated Independent School District. He is currently serving as a board member on the board of trustees. His current term ends in May 2025.

Sampson has been a resident of the district for many years and even grew up in the district, attending Harlem Elementary, and Highlands Junior School. He is a 1974 graduate of Sterling High School. After graduating from Sterling, Sampson attended the University of Arkansas, where he earned a bachelor's degree in sociology in 1978 and earned a master's degree in city planning from Texas Southern University in 1987. He also attended and earned a certification from the University of Houston's mediation school.

Sampson retired from the Harris County Precinct 2 Road & Bridge Inspection Department as Assistant Superintendent, where he worked since 1997. Howard Sampson was appointed to the Goose Creek CISD Board of Trustees for District 1 in August 2009. He was elected to the Board in May 2010 and currently serving.

== See also ==
- Goose Creek Consolidated Independent School District
