= Larry Tearry =

American football player (born 1956)

No. 54
- Position: Center

Personal information
- Born: April 24, 1956 (age 70); Erwin, North Carolina, U.S.
- Listed height: 6 ft 3 in (1.91 m)
- Listed weight: 260 lb (118 kg)

Career information
- High school: E. E. Smith (Fayetteville, North Carolina)
- College: Wake Forest (1974–1977)
- NFL draft: 1978: 4th round, 109th overall pick

Career history
- Detroit Lions (1978–1979); Kansas City Chiefs (1980)*; Miami Dolphins (1981)*
- * Offseason or practice squad member only

Awards and highlights
- First-team All-ACC (1977)

Career NFL statistics
- Games played: 25
- Games started: 22
- Stats at Pro Football Reference

Larry Wayne Tearry (born April 24, 1956) is an American former professional football player who was a center for two seasons with the Detroit Lions of the National Football League (NFL). He was selected by the Lions in the fourth round of the 1978 NFL draft after playing college football for the Wake Forest Demon Deacons.

== Early life and college ==
Larry Wayne Tearry was born on April 24, 1956, in Erwin, North Carolina. He played high school football at E.E. Smith High School in Fayetteville, North Carolina as an offensive tackle. He was inducted into the Fayetteville Sports Club Hall of Fame in 2017.

Tearry was a four-year letterman for the Demon Deacons of Wake Forest University from 1974 to 1977. He was an offensive tackle his freshman year but was moved to center as a sophomore. He was named first-team All-ACC by the Associated Press as a senior in 1977. Tearry was a team captain while at Wake Forest. He also spent time writing poetry in college.

== Professional career ==
Tearry was selected by the Detroit Lions in the fourth round, with 109th overall pick, of the 1978 NFL draft. He officially signed with the team on June 15. He played in 14 games, starting 12, for the Lions as a rookie in 1978. Tearry appeared in 11 games, starting ten, in 1979 before being placed on injured reserve on November 16, 1979.

On April 6, 1980, Tearry was traded to the Kansas City Chiefs for a 1980 fifth-round pick and a 1980 ninth-round pick. He was released on August 19, 1980.

Tearry signed with the Miami Dolphins on July 20, 1981. He was released on July 27, 1981, after he left the team during training camp.

== Personal life ==
Tearry was later an assistant principal and athletic director at Terry Sanford High School in Fayetteville.
