= Alan Caldwell =

American football player (born 1956)

No. 45
- Position: Defensive back

Personal information
- Born: May 22, 1956 (age 70); Winston-Salem, North Carolina, U.S.
- Listed height: 6 ft 0 in (1.83 m)
- Listed weight: 176 lb (80 kg)

Career information
- High school: Kernersville (NC) East Forsyth
- College: North Carolina
- NFL draft: 1978: undrafted

Career history
- Los Angeles Rams (1978)*; New York Giants (1979)
- * Offseason or practice squad member only

Awards and highlights
- First-team All-ACC (1977)

Career NFL statistics
- Games played: 16
- Interceptions: 2
- Fumble recoveries: 1
- Stats at Pro Football Reference

Alan Lorenzo Caldwell (born May 22, 1956) is an American former professional football player who was a defensive back for the New York Giants of the National Football League (NFL) in 1979. He played college football for the North Carolina Tar Heels.
