= Lyman Smith =

Lyman Smith may refer to:

- Lyman Bradford Smith (1904–1997), American botanist
- Lyman Cornelius Smith (1850–1910), American innovator and industrialist
- Lyman H. Smith (1918–1986), Justice of the Supreme Court of New York
- Lyman Smith (American football) (born 1956), American football defensive tackle
