= 1977 Richmond Spiders football team =

American college football season

1977 Richmond Spiders football
- Conference: Independent
- Record: 3–8
- Head coach: Jim Tait (4th season)
- Captains: David Taylor; Lou Bonato
- Home stadium: City Stadium

1977 NCAA Division I independents football records
	Conf.					Overall
Team	W		L		T	W		L		T
No. 1 Notre Dame		–		–		11	–	1	–	0
No. 5 Penn State		–		–		11	–	1	–	0
Colgate		–		–		10	–	1	–	0
North Texas State *		–		–		10	–	1	–	0
No. 16 San Diego State		–		–		10	–	1	–	0
Tennessee State		–		–		8	–	1	–	1
No. 14 Florida State		–		–		10	–	2	–	0
No. 8 Pittsburgh		–		–		9	–	2	–	1
East Carolina		–		–		8	–	3	–	0
Rutgers		–		–		8	–	3	–	0
Army		–		–		7	–	4	–	0
Louisville		–		–		7	–	4	–	1
Boston College		–		–		6	–	5	–	0
Cincinnati		–		–		5	–	4	–	2
Georgia Tech		–		–		6	–	5	–	0
Memphis State		–		–		6	–	5	–	0
Northwestern State		–		–		6	–	5	–	0
Syracuse		–		–		6	–	5	–	0
William & Mary		–		–		6	–	5	–	0
Southern Miss		–		–		6	–	5	–	0
Temple		–		–		5	–	5	–	1
Hawaii		–		–		5	–	6	–	0
Navy		–		–		5	–	6	–	0
West Virginia		–		–		5	–	6	–	0
South Carolina		–		–		5	–	7	–	0
Utah State		–		–		4	–	7	–	0
Villanova		–		–		4	–	7	–	0
Illinois State		–		–		3	–	7	–	1
Virginia Tech		–		–		3	–	7	–	1
Miami (FL)		–		–		3	–	8	–	0
Richmond		–		–		3	–	8	–	0
Tulane		–		–		3	–	8	–	0
Air Force		–		–		2	–	8	–	1
Holy Cross		–		–		2	–	8	–	0
Northeast Louisiana		–		–		2	–	9	–	0
North Texas State (originally 9–2) awarded a forfeit win after Mississippi State was found to be using an ineligible player.; Rankings from AP Poll

The 1977 Richmond Spiders football team was an American football team that represented the University of Richmond as an independent during the 1977 NCAA Division I football season. In their fourth season under head coach Jim Tait, Richmond compiled a 3–8 record.

== Schedule ==
Date	Opponent	Site	Result	Attendance	Source
September 10	at West Virginia	Mountaineer Field; Morgantown, WV	L 0–36	35,545	
September 17	at North Carolina	Kenan Memorial Stadium; Chapel Hill, NC	L 0–31	47,100	
September 24	Appalachian State	City Stadium; Richmond, VA	W 21–13	13,000	
October 1	North Texas State	City Stadium; Richmond, VA	L 14–47	11,000	
October 8	at VMI	Alumni Memorial Field; Lexington, VA	L 0–25	6,800	
October 15	at East Carolina	Ficklen Memorial Stadium; Greenville, NC	L 14–35	19,010	
October 22	Virginia Tech	City Stadium; Richmond, VA	W 17–14	19,500	
October 29	at Georgia	Sanford Stadium; Athens, GA	L 7–23	48,500	
November 5	Furman	City Stadium; Richmond, VA	W 19–13	12,000	
November 12	Maryland	City Stadium; Richmond, VA	L 24–27	17,000	
November 19	at William & Mary	Cary Field; Williamsburg, VA (rivalry)	L 13–29	14,000	
