= 1978 NFL draft =

National Football League draft

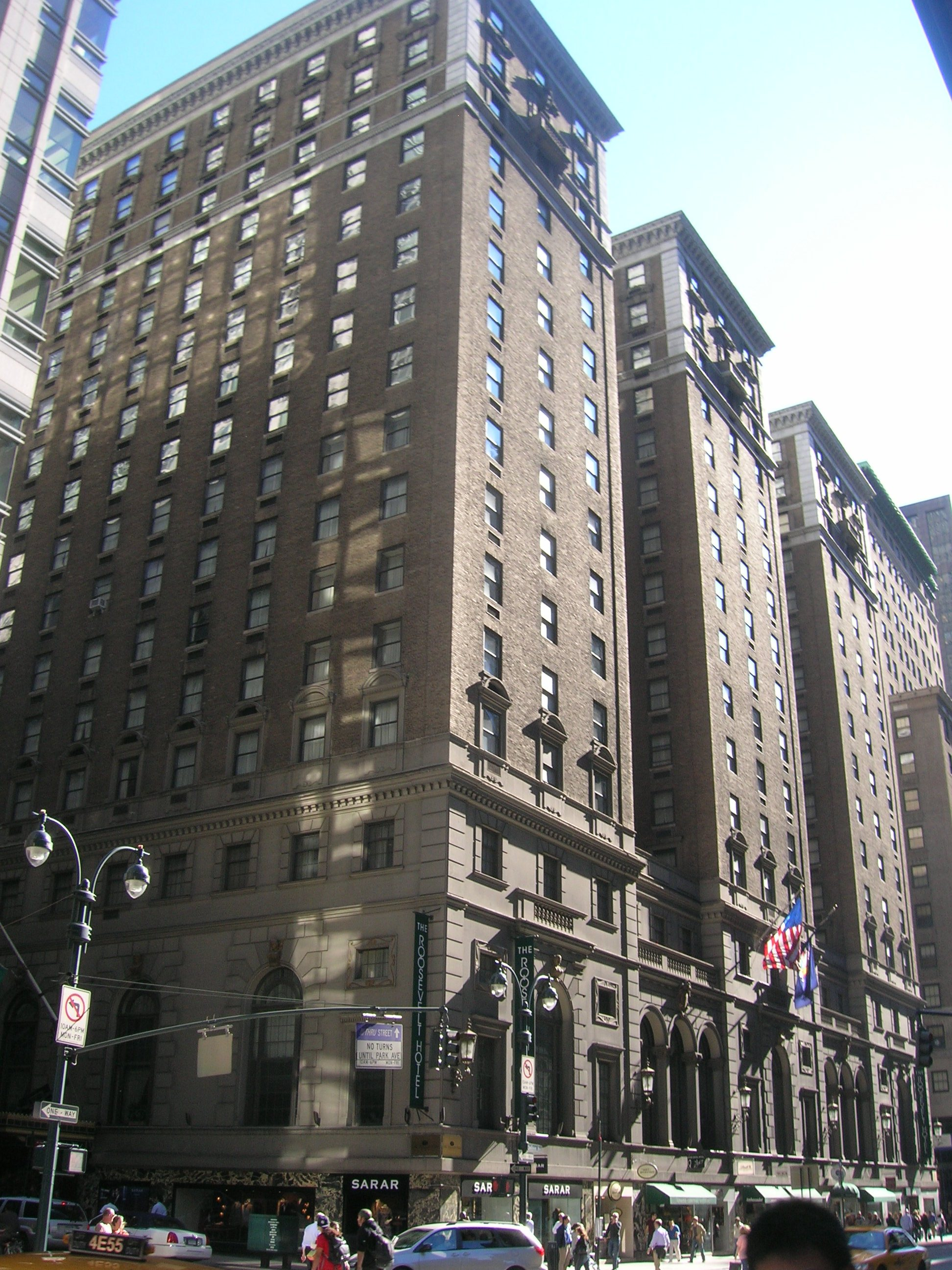
- Roosevelt Hotel (location of the draft), photographed in 2008

General information
- Date: May 2–3, 1978
- Location: Roosevelt Hotel in New York City, New York

Overview
- 334 total selections in 12 rounds
- League: NFL
- First selection: Earl Campbell, RB; Houston Oilers
- Mr. Irrelevant: Lee Washburn, G Dallas Cowboys
- Most selections (18): Cincinnati Bengals
- Fewest selections (5): Denver Broncos
- Hall of Famers: 4: RB Earl Campbell; WR James Lofton; TE Ozzie Newsome; QB Warren Moon

The 1978 NFL draft was the procedure by which National Football League teams selected amateur college football players. It is officially known as the NFL Annual Player Selection Meeting. The draft was held May 2–3, 1978, at the Roosevelt Hotel in New York City, New York. The league also held a supplemental draft after the regular draft and before the regular season.

The Tampa Bay Buccaneers had the first overall pick in the 1978 draft, by virtue of their 2–12 record in 1977. Tampa Bay traded the pick to the Oilers, for tight end Jimmie Giles and the Oilers' first- and second-round picks in the 1978 draft, and their third- and fifth-round picks in 1979.

Leon White, who was drafted in the third round, went on to have an extensive professional wrestling career as Big Van Vader.

== Player selections ==
*	= compensatory selection
†	= Pro Bowler
‡	= Hall of Famer

Positions key
Offense	Defense	Special teams
QB — Quarterback; RB — Running back; FB — Fullback; WR — Wide receiver; TE — Tight end; OL — Offensive lineman; T — Tackle; G — Guard; C — Center	DL — Defensive lineman; DT — Defensive tackle (Note: Includes nose tackle (NT)); DE — Defensive end; EDGE — Edge rusher; LB — Linebacker (Note: Includes middle linebacker (MLB/MIKE), weakside linebacker (WILL), strongside linebacker (SAM), off-ball linebacker, and outside linebacker (OLB)); DB — Defensive back; CB — Cornerback; S — Safety (Note: Includes free safety (FS) and strong safety (SS))	K — Kicker (Note: Also known as a placekicker (PK)); P — Punter; LS — Long snapper; RS — Return specialist (Note: Includes kickoff and punt returners)

Rnd.	Pick	Team	Player	Pos.	College	Notes
1	1	Houston Oilers	Earl Campbell^{‡}^{†}	RB	Texas	from Tampa Bay Heisman Trophy winner
1	2	Kansas City Chiefs	Art Still ^{†}	DE	Kentucky	
1	3	New Orleans Saints	Wes Chandler ^{†}	WR	Florida	
1	4	New York Jets	Chris Ward	T	Ohio State	
1	5	Buffalo Bills	Terry Miller	RB	Oklahoma State	
1	6	Green Bay Packers	James Lofton^{‡}^{†}	WR	Stanford	
1	7	San Francisco 49ers	Ken MacAfee	TE	Notre Dame	
1	8	Cincinnati Bengals	Ross Browner	DE	Notre Dame	from Philadelphia
1	9	Seattle Seahawks	Keith Simpson	CB	Memphis State	
1	10	New York Giants	Gordon King	T	Stanford	
1	11	Detroit Lions	Luther Bradley	CB	Notre Dame	
1	12	Cleveland Browns	Clay Matthews ^{†}	LB	USC	
1	13	Atlanta Falcons	Mike Kenn ^{†}	T	Michigan	
1	14	San Diego Chargers	John Jefferson ^{†}	WR	Arizona State	
1	15	St. Louis Cardinals	Steve Little	K	Arkansas	
1	16	Cincinnati Bengals	Blair Bush	C	Washington	
1	17	Tampa Bay Buccaneers	Doug Williams	QB	Grambling State	from Houston
1	18	New England Patriots	Bob Cryder	G	Alabama	
1	19	St. Louis Cardinals	Ken Greene	S	Washington State	from Washington
1	20	Los Angeles Rams	Elvis Peacock	RB	Oklahoma	from Chicago via Cleveland
1	21	Minnesota Vikings	Randy Holloway	DE	Pittsburgh	
1	22	Pittsburgh Steelers	Ron Johnson	CB	Eastern Michigan	
1	23	Cleveland Browns	Ozzie Newsome^{‡}^{†}	TE	Alabama	from Los Angeles
1	24	San Francisco 49ers	Dan Bunz	LB	Long Beach State	from Miami
1	25	Baltimore Colts	Reese McCall	TE	Auburn	
1	26	Green Bay Packers	John Anderson	LB	Michigan	from Oakland
1	27	Denver Broncos	Don Latimer	DT	Miami (FL)	
1	28	Dallas Cowboys	Larry Bethea	DE	Michigan State	
2	29	Kansas City Chiefs	Sylvester Hicks	DE	Tennessee State	
2	30	Tampa Bay Buccaneers	Johnny Davis	RB	Alabama	
2	31	New York Jets	Mark Merrill	LB	Minnesota	
2	32	Buffalo Bills	Dee Hardison	DE	North Carolina	
2	33	New Orleans Saints	James Taylor	T	Missouri	
2	34	Green Bay Packers	Mike Hunt	LB	Minnesota	
2	35	Cincinnati Bengals	Ray Griffin	CB	Ohio State	from Philadelphia
2	36	Seattle Seahawks	Keith Butler	LB	Memphis State	
2	37	New York Giants	Odis McKinney	CB	Colorado	
2	38	Buffalo Bills	Scott Hutchinson	DE	Florida	from San Francisco
2	39	Cleveland Browns	Johnny Evans	P	NC State	
2	40	Detroit Lions	Al Baker ^{†}	DE	Colorado State	
2	41	San Diego Chargers	Milton Hardaway	T	Oklahoma State	
2	42	St. Louis Cardinals	John Barefield	LB	Texas A&I	
2	43	Atlanta Falcons	Steve Stewart	LB	Minnesota	
2	44	Tampa Bay Buccaneers	Brett Moritz	G	Nebraska	from Houston
2	45	Cincinnati Bengals	Dave Turner	RB	San Diego State	
2	46	Los Angeles Rams	Stan Johnson	DT	Tennessee State	from Washington
2	47	San Francisco 49ers	Walt Downing	G	Michigan	from Chicago
2	48	Minnesota Vikings	John Turner	CB	Miami (FL)	
2	49	Pittsburgh Steelers	Willie Fry	DE	Notre Dame	
2	50	New England Patriots	Matt Cavanaugh	QB	Pittsburgh	
2	51	Miami Dolphins	Guy Benjamin	QB	Stanford	
2	52	Baltimore Colts	Mike Woods	LB	Cincinnati	
2	53	Los Angeles Rams	Ron Smith	WR	San Diego State	
2	54	Oakland Raiders	Dave Browning	DE	Washington	
2	55	Denver Broncos	Bill Gay	TE	USC	
2	56	Dallas Cowboys	Todd Christensen ^{†}	TE	BYU	
3	57	Oakland Raiders	Derrick Jensen	RB	Texas Arlington	from Tampa Bay
3	58	Kansas City Chiefs	Gary Spani	LB	Kansas State	
3	59	Buffalo Bills	Dennis Johnson	FB	Mississippi State	
3	60	New Orleans Saints	Barry Bennett	DT	Concordia (Moorhead)	
3	61	New York Jets	Mickey Shuler	TE	Penn State	
3	62	Green Bay Packers	Estus Hood	CB	Illinois State	
3	63	Seattle Seahawks	Bob Jury	CB	Pittsburgh	
3	64	Miami Dolphins	Lyman Smith	DT	Duke	from N. Y. Giants
3	65	Buffalo Bills	Danny Fulton	WR	Nebraska–Omaha	from San Francisco
3	66	Philadelphia Eagles	Reggie Wilkes	LB	Georgia Tech	
3	67	Cleveland Browns	Larry Collins	RB	Texas A&I	from Detroit
3	68	Cleveland Browns	Mark Miller	QB	Bowling Green	
3	69	St. Louis Cardinals	Doug Greene	DB	Texas A&I	
3	70	Atlanta Falcons	Stan Waldemore	G	Nebraska	
3	71	San Diego Chargers	Rickey Anderson	RB	South Carolina State	
3	72	Cincinnati Bengals	Ted Vincent	DT	Wichita State	
3	73	Houston Oilers	Gifford Nielsen	QB	BYU	
3	74	Chicago Bears	Brad Shearer	DT	Texas	
3	75	Minnesota Vikings	Whip Walton	LB	San Diego State	
3	76	Pittsburgh Steelers	Craig Colquitt	P	Tennessee	
3	77	New England Patriots	Carlos Pennywell	WR	Grambling State	
3	78	Los Angeles Rams	Frank Corral	K	UCLA	from Washington
3	79	San Francisco 49ers	Ernie Hughes	G	Notre Dame	from Baltimore
3	80	Los Angeles Rams	Leon White	C	Colorado	
3	81	Miami Dolphins	Jimmy Cefalo	WR	Penn State	
3	82	Oakland Raiders	Lindsey Mason	T	Kansas	
3	83	Cincinnati Bengals	Don Bass	WR	Houston	from Denver
3	84	Dallas Cowboys	Dave Hudgens	T	Oklahoma	
4	85	Kansas City Chiefs	Daniel Johnson	LB	Tennessee State	
4	86	Oakland Raiders	Maurice Harvey	S	Ball State	from Tampa Bay
4	87	New Orleans Saints	Don Schwartz	S	Washington State	
4	88	New York Jets	Dodie Donnell	RB	Nebraska	
4	89	Buffalo Bills	Lucius Sanford	LB	Georgia Tech	
4	–	Green Bay Packers	no pick, penalized by NFL for staging illegal workouts in February with draft-eligible players			
4	90	New York Giants	Billy Taylor	RB	Texas Tech	
4	91	San Francisco 49ers	Terry LeCount	WR	Florida	
4	92	Philadelphia Eagles	Dennis Harrison	DT	Vanderbilt	
4	–	Seattle Seahawks	The Seattle Seahawks forfeited their 1978 fourth round pick after selecting Al Hunter in the 1977 Supplemental draft			
4	93	Miami Dolphins	Gerald Small	CB	San Jose State	from Cleveland
4	94	Detroit Lions	William Fifer	T	West Texas State	
4	95	Atlanta Falcons	Brian Cabral	LB	Colorado	
4	96	St. Louis Cardinals	George Collins	G	Georgia	from San Diego
4	97	St. Louis Cardinals	Jimmy Childs	WR	Cal Poly	
4	98	Houston Oilers	Mike Renfro	WR	TCU	
4	99	Cincinnati Bengals	Dennis Law	WR	East Tennessee State	
4	100	Minnesota Vikings	Jim Hough	C	Utah State	
4	101	Pittsburgh Steelers	Larry Anderson	CB	Louisiana Tech	
4	102	New England Patriots	Dwight Wheeler	T	Tennessee State	
4	103	Cleveland Browns	Pete Pallara	G	Tennessee-Chattanooga	from Washington via Los Angeles
4	104	Kansas City Chiefs	Pete Woods	QB	Missouri	from Chicago
4	105	Los Angeles Rams	Mark Manges	QB	Maryland	
4	106	Miami Dolphins	Eric Laakso	T	Tulane	
4	107	Detroit Lions	Homer Elias	G	Tennessee State	from Baltimore
4	108	Oakland Raiders	Joe Stewart	WR	Missouri	
4	109	Detroit Lions	Larry Tearry	C	Wake Forest	from Denver
4	110	Dallas Cowboys	Alois Blackwell	RB	Houston	
5	111	Miami Dolphins	Ted Burgmeier	S	Notre Dame	from Tampa Bay
5	112	Kansas City Chiefs	Jerrold McRae	WR	Tennessee State	
5	113	New York Jets	Randy Sidler	LB	Penn State	
5	114	Buffalo Bills	Ken Spaeth	TE	Nebraska	
5	115	New Orleans Saints	Eric Felton	CB	Texas Tech	
5	116	Green Bay Packers	Mike Douglass	LB	San Diego State	
5	117	Baltimore Colts	Frank Myers	T	Texas A&M	from San Francisco
5	118	Kansas City Chiefs	Dwight Carey	DT	Texas Arlington	from Philadelphia
5	119	Seattle Seahawks	Louis Bullard	T	Jackson State	
5	120	New York Giants	Terry Jackson	CB	San Diego State	
5	121	Detroit Lions	Amos Fowler	G	Southern Miss	
5	122	Cleveland Browns	Keith Wright	WR	Memphis State	
5	123	Detroit Lions	Dan Gray	DE	Rutgers	from San Diego
5	124	St. Louis Cardinals	Earl Carr	RB	Florida	
5	125	Atlanta Falcons	Dennis Pearson	WR	San Diego State	
5	126	Cincinnati Bengals	Tom Dinkel	LB	Kansas	
5	127	San Francisco 49ers	Archie Reese	DT	Clemson	from Houston via Kansas City thorough Chicago
5	128	Green Bay Packers	Willie Wilder	RB	Florida	from Pittsburgh
5	129	New England Patriots	Bill Matthews	LB	South Dakota State	
5	130	Philadelphia Eagles	Norris Banks	RB	Kansas	from Washington
5	131	Cincinnati Bengals	Rob Hertel	QB	USC	from Chicago
5	132	New York Giants	Jim Krahl	DT	Texas Tech	from Minnesota
5	133	San Francisco 49ers	Bruce Threadgill	S	Mississippi State	from Miami
5	134	Kansas City Chiefs	Robert Woods	WR	Grambling State	from Baltimore
5	135	San Diego Chargers	John Choma	G	Virginia	from Los Angeles
5	136	Oakland Raiders	Derrick Ramsey	TE	Kentucky	
5	137	New York Giants	Brian DeRoo	WR	Redlands	from Denver
5	138	Dallas Cowboys	Rich Rosen	G	Syracuse	
6	139	Chicago Bears	John Skibinski	RB	Purdue	from Kansas City
6	140	Oakland Raiders	Tom Davis	C	Nebraska	from Tampa Bay
6	141	New York Jets	Bobby Jackson	CB	Florida State	from Buffalo
6	142	New Orleans Saints	Mike Rieker	QB	Lehigh	
6	143	New York Jets	Gregg Robinson	DT	Dartmouth	
6	144	Green Bay Packers	Leotis Harris	G	Arkansas	
6	145	Buffalo Bills	Eric Smith	T	Southern Miss	from Philadelphia
6	146	Seattle Seahawks	Glenn Starks	WR	Texas A&I	
6	147	New York Giants	Randy Pass	G	Georgia Tech	
6	148	San Francisco 49ers	Elliott Walker	RB	Pittsburgh	
6	149	Cleveland Browns	Al Pitts	C	Michigan State	
6	150	Detroit Lions	Dwight Hicks ^{†}	S	Michigan	
6	151	St. Louis Cardinals	Jack Williams	DE	Bowling Green	
6	152	Atlanta Falcons	Rodney Parker	WR	Tennessee State	
6	153	Detroit Lions	Tony Ardizzone	G	Northwestern	from San Diego
6	154	Houston Oilers	Conrad Rucker	TE	Southern	
6	155	Cincinnati Bengals	Steve Geise	RB	Penn State	
6	156	New England Patriots	Kem Coleman	LB	Ole Miss	
6	157	New Orleans Saints	Francis Chesley	LB	Wyoming	from Washington via Houston
6	158	Chicago Bears	Mekeli Ieremia	DE	BYU	
6	159	Washington Redskins	Tony Green ^{†}	RB	Florida	from San Francisco
6	160	Pittsburgh Steelers	Randy Reutershan	WR	Pittsburgh	
6	161	Baltimore Colts	Ben Garry	RB	Southern Miss	
6	162	Tampa Bay Buccaneers	Elijah Marshall	WR	NC State	from Los Angeles
6	163	Miami Dolphins	Doug Betters ^{†}	DE	Nevada	
6	164	Oakland Raiders	Mike Levenseller	WR	Washington State	
6	165	Detroit Lions	Jesse Thompson	WR	California	from Denver
6	166	Dallas Cowboys	Harold Randolph	LB	East Carolina	
7	167	Atlanta Falcons	Alfred Jackson	WR	Texas	from Tampa Bay
7	168	Kansas City Chiefs	Ricky Odom	CB	USC	
7	169	New York Jets	Levi Armstrong	DB	UCLA	from New Orleans
7	170	New York Jets	James Earley	RB	Michigan State	
7	171	Buffalo Bills	Mario Celotto	LB	USC	
7	172	Green Bay Packers	George Plasketes	LB	Ole Miss	
7	173	Seattle Seahawks	John Harris	S	Arizona State	
7	174	New York Giants	Dan Doornink	RB	Washington State	
7	175	San Francisco 49ers	Fred Quillan ^{†}	C	Oregon	
7	176	Oakland Raiders	Arthur Whittington	RB	SMU	from Philadelphia
7	177	Detroit Lions	Bruce Gibson	RB	Pacific	
7	178	Miami Dolphins	Karl Baldischwiler	T	Oklahoma	from Cleveland
7	179	Atlanta Falcons	James Wright	TE	TCU	
7	180	San Diego Chargers	Cliff Featherstone	DB	Colorado State	
7	181	St. Louis Cardinals	Dave Stief	WR	Portland State	
7	182	Cincinnati Bengals	Joe Branson	DB	Livingstone	
7	183	Buffalo Bills	Steve Powell	RB	Northeast Missouri State	from Houston
7	184	Kansas City Chiefs	Bill Kellar	WR	Stanford	from Washington
7	185	Chicago Bears	Herman Jones	WR	Ohio State	
7	186	Philadelphia Eagles	Greg Marshall	DT	Oregon State	from Minnesota
7	187	Pittsburgh Steelers	Mark Dufresne	TE	Nebraska	
7	188	New England Patriots	Mike Hawkins	LB	Texas A&I	
7	189	Los Angeles Rams	Reggie Doss	DE	Hampton	
7	190	Miami Dolphins	Lloyd Henry	WR	Northeast Missouri State	
7	191	Baltimore Colts	Jeff Logan	RB	Ohio State	
7	192	Oakland Raiders	Earl Inmon	LB	Bethune–Cookman	
7	193	Cincinnati Bengals	Danny Bass	T	Elon	from Denver
7	194	Dallas Cowboys	Tom Randall	DT	Iowa State	
8	195	Kansas City Chiefs	John Henry White	RB	Louisiana Tech	
8	196	Tampa Bay Buccaneers	John McGriff	LB	Miami (FL)	
8	197	New York Jets	Derrick Gaffney	WR	Florida	
8	198	New England Patriots	Terry Falcon	G	Montana	
8	199	New Orleans Saints	Brooks Williams	TE	North Carolina	
8	200	Green Bay Packers	Dennis Sproul	QB	Arizona State	
8	201	New York Giants	Jeff Grady	LB	Florida A&M	
8	202	Washington Redskins	Walker Lee	WR	North Carolina	
8	203	New York Jets	Mike Mock	P	Texas Tech	
8	204	Minnesota Vikings	Mike Wood	K	Southeast Missouri State	
8	205	Cleveland Browns	Jesse Turnbow	DT	Tennessee	
8	206	Detroit Lions	Jim Breech	K	California	
8	207	Oakland Raiders	Mark Nichols	DE	Colorado State	
8	208	Pittsburgh Steelers	Rick Moser	RB	Rhode Island	
8	209	Atlanta Falcons	David Adkins	LB	Ohio State	
8	210	Houston Oilers	J. C. Wilson	DB	Pittsburgh	
8	211	Cincinnati Bengals	Bill Miller	T	Western Illinois	
8	212	Chicago Bears	George Freitas	TE	California	
8	213	New York Jets	Roy Eppes	DB	Clemson	
8	214	Pittsburgh Steelers	Andre Keyes	WR	Cal Poly	
8	215	New England Patriots	Mosi Tatupu ^{†}	RB	USC	
8	216	Atlanta Falcons	David Williams	DB	Tennessee–Martin	
8	217	Miami Dolphins	Sean Clancy	LB	Amherst	
8	218	Baltimore Colts	Monte Anthony	RB	Nebraska	
8	219	Washington Redskins	Don Hover	LB	Washington State	
8	220	San Diego Chargers	Gavin Hendrick	P	Washington State	
8	221	Denver Broncos	Frank Smith	T	Alabama A&M	
8	222	Dallas Cowboys	Homer Butler	WR	UCLA	
9	223	Tampa Bay Buccaneers	Willie Taylor	WR	Pittsburgh	
9	224	Kansas City Chiefs	Larry Brown	T	Miami (FL)	
9	225	New York Jets	Reggie Grant	DB	Oregon	
9	226	New Orleans Saints	Richard Carter	DB	NC State	
9	227	New York Jets	Neil Hutton	DB	Penn State	
9	228	Green Bay Packers	Keith Myers	QB	Utah State	
9	229	San Francisco 49ers	Herman Redden	DB	Howard	
9	230	Philadelphia Eagles	Charles Williams	DB	Jackson State	
9	231	Seattle Seahawks	Rich Grimmett	T	Illinois	
9	232	New York Giants	Bill Swiacki	TE	Amherst	
9	233	San Francisco 49ers	Dean Moore	LB	Iowa	
9	234	Cleveland Browns	Jon Kramer	G	Baylor	
9	235	St. Louis Cardinals	Joe Mosley	TE	Central State (OH)	
9	236	Atlanta Falcons	Tom Pridemore	S	West Virginia	
9	237	San Diego Chargers	Henry Bradley	DT	Alcorn State	
9	238	Cincinnati Bengals	Ron Shumon	LB	Wichita State	
9	239	Houston Oilers	Jim Mol	DE	Morningside	
9	240	Minnesota Vikings	Mike Deutsch	P	Colorado State	
9	241	Pittsburgh Steelers	Lance Reynolds	T	BYU	
9	242	New England Patriots	Tim Peterson	LB	Arizona State	
9	243	Washington Redskins	Mike Martin	QB	Santa Clara	
9	244	Chicago Bears	Mike Martin	LB	Kentucky	
9	245	Baltimore Colts	Dave Studdard	T	Texas	
9	246	Los Angeles Rams	Andre Anderson	DE	New Mexico State	
9	247	Miami Dolphins	Bruce Hardy	TE	Arizona State	
9	248	San Diego Chargers	Blake Whitlatch	LB	LSU	
9	249	San Francisco 49ers	Steve McDaniels	T	Notre Dame	
9	250	Dallas Cowboys	Russ Williams	DB	Tennessee	
10	251	Kansas City Chiefs	Earl Bryant	DE	Jackson State	
10	252	Tampa Bay Buccaneers	Aaron Brown	LB	Ohio State	
10	253	New York Giants	Greg Jorgensen	G	Nebraska	
10	254	New York Jets	Louis Richardson	DE	Florida State	
10	255	Buffalo Bills	Will Grant	C	Kentucky	
10	256	Green Bay Packers	Larry Key	RB	Florida State	
10	257	Atlanta Falcons	Ricky Patton	RB	Jackson State	
10	258	Seattle Seahawks	Rob Stewart	N/A	Lafayette	
10	259	Green Bay Packers	Mark Totten	C	Florida	
10	260	San Francisco 49ers	Mike Connell	P	Cincinnati	
10	261	Cleveland Browns	Brent Watson	T	Tennessee	
10	262	Detroit Lions	Fred Arrington	LB	Purdue	
10	263	Atlanta Falcons	Ray Strong	RB	UNLV	
10	264	San Diego Chargers	Charles Price	TE	Cincinnati	
10	265	St. Louis Cardinals	Randy Gill	LB	San Jose State	
10	266	Houston Oilers	Steve Young	TE	Wake Forest	
10	267	Cincinnati Bengals	Tom DePaso	LB	Penn State	
10	268	Pittsburgh Steelers	Doug Becker	LB	Notre Dame	
10	269	New England Patriots	Bryan Ferguson	DB	Miami (FL)	
10	270	Washington Redskins	Scott Hartenstein	DE	Azusa Pacific	
10	271	Chicago Bears	Ben Zambiasi	LB	Georgia	
10	272	Minnesota Vikings	Hughie Shaw	RB	Texas A&I	
10	273	Los Angeles Rams	Charles Peal	T	Indiana	
10	274	Miami Dolphins	Mark Dennard	C	Texas A&M	
10	275	Baltimore Colts	Dallas Owens	DB	Kentucky	
10	276	Pittsburgh Steelers	Tom Jurich	K	Northern Arizona	from Tampa Bay for Ernie Holmes
10	277	Denver Broncos	Vince Kinney	WR	Maryland	
10	278	Dallas Cowboys	Barry Tomasetti	T	Iowa	
11	279	Pittsburgh Steelers	Nat Terry	DB	Florida State	from Tampa Bay for Ernie Holmes
11	280	Kansas City Chiefs	Ray Milo	DB	New Mexico State	
11	281	New York Jets	Pat Ryan	QB	Tennessee	
11	282	Buffalo Bills	Jerry Blanton	LB	Kentucky	
11	283	New Orleans Saints	Nathan Besaint	DT	Southern	
11	284	Green Bay Packers	Terry Jones	DT	Alabama	
11	285	New Orleans Saints	Dave Riley	RB	West Virginia	
11	286	New York Giants	Dennis Heim	DT	Southwest Missouri State	
11	287	San Francisco 49ers	Willie McCray	DE	Troy State	
11	288	Philadelphia Eagles	Billy Campfield	RB	Kansas	
11	289	Detroit Lions	Richard Murray	DT	Oklahoma	
11	290	Cleveland Browns	Larry Gillard	DT	Mississippi State	
11	291	Oakland Raiders	Dean Jones	DB	Fresno State	
11	292	Cincinnati Bengals	Cal Prince	RB	Louisville	
11	293	Atlanta Falcons	Scooter Reed	DB	Baylor	
11	294	Cincinnati Bengals	Mark Donahue	G	Michigan	
11	295	Houston Oilers	Willie Thicklen	WR	Alabama State	
11	296	New England Patriots	Charlie Williams	LB	Florida	
11	297	Washington Redskins	Mike Williams	DB	Texas A&M	
11	298	Chicago Bears	Walt Underwood	DE	USC	
11	299	Minnesota Vikings	Ron Harris	RB	Colorado State	
11	300	Pittsburgh Steelers	Tom Brzoza	C	Pittsburgh	
11	301	Seattle Seahawks	George Halas	LB	Miami (FL)	
11	302	Baltimore Colts	Henry Mason	WR	Central Missouri State	
11	303	Los Angeles Rams	Ron Hostetler	LB	Penn State	
11	304	Oakland Raiders	Bob Glazebrook	DB	Fresno State	
11	305	Denver Broncos	Lacy Brumley	T	Clemson	
11	306	Dallas Cowboys	Dennis Thurman	CB	USC	
12	307	Kansas City Chiefs	Willie Brock	C	Colorado	
12	308	Tampa Bay Buccaneers	Kevin McLee	RB	Georgia	
12	309	Buffalo Bills	Richard Crump	RB	Northeastern State	
12	310	New Orleans Saints	Larry Hardy	TE	Jackson State	
12	311	New York Jets	Alan Williams	P	Florida	
12	312	Green Bay Packers	Eason Ramson	TE	Washington State	
12	313	New York Giants	Greg Lawson	RB	Western Illinois	
12	314	San Francisco 49ers	Dan Irons	T	Texas Tech	
12	315	Philadelphia Eagles	Mark Slater	C	Minnesota	
12	316	Seattle Seahawks	Jeff Bergeron	RB	Lamar	
12	317	Cleveland Browns	Leo Biedermann	T	California	
12	318	Detroit Lions	Mark Patterson	DB	Washington State	
12	319	St. Louis Cardinals	Anthony Clay	LB	South Carolina State	
12	320	Atlanta Falcons	Daria Butler	LB	Oklahoma State	
12	321	San Diego Chargers	Kevin Bell	WR	Lamar	
12	322	Houston Oilers	John Schuhmacher	G	USC	
12	323	Cincinnati Bengals	Kim Featsent	WR	Kent State	
12	324	Washington Redskins	Steve McCabe	G	Bowdoin	
12	325	Chicago Bears	Lew Sibley	LB	LSU	
12	326	Minnesota Vikings	Jeff Morrow	T	Minnesota	
12	327	Pittsburgh Steelers	Brad Carr	LB	Maryland	
12	328	New England Patriots	John Gibney	C	Colgate	
12	329	Baltimore Colts	Bruce Allen	P	Richmond	
12	330	Los Angeles Rams	Gus Coppens	T	UCLA	
12	331	Miami Dolphins	Mike Moore	RB	Middle Tennessee	
12	332	Oakland Raiders	Joe Conron	WR	Pacific	
12	333	Miami Dolphins	Bill Kenney ^{†}	QB	Northern Colorado	
12	334	Dallas Cowboys	Lee Washburn	G	Montana State	

== Supplemental draft ==
Rnd.	Pick	Team	Player	Pos.	College	Notes
12	—	San Francisco 49ers	Rod Connors	RB	USC	

== Notable undrafted players ==
^{†}	= Pro Bowler	‡	= Hall of Famer

Original NFL team	Player	Pos.	College	Notes
Atlanta Falcons	Lewis Gilbert	TE	Florida	
Atlanta Falcons	Hans Nielsen	K	Michigan State	
Baltimore Colts	Roger Farmer	WR	Baker	
Buffalo Bills	Joe Shipp	TE	USC	
Chicago Bears	Mike Morgan	RB	Wisconsin	
Chicago Bears	Jack Steptoe	WR	Utah	
Chicago Bears	Mike Ulmer	S	Doane	
Dallas Cowboys	Dave Kraayeveld	DE	Milton	
Dallas Cowboys	Joe Moreino	DT	Idaho State	
Dallas Cowboys	Robert Steele	WR	North Alabama	
Denver Broncos	Herb Christopher	S	Morris Brown	
Detroit Lions	Ken Callicutt	RB	Clemson	
Detroit Lions	Kit Lathrop	DT	Arizona State	
Detroit Lions	John Sokolosky	C	Wayne State	
Green Bay Packers	Paul Coffman ^{†}	TE	Kansas State	
Green Bay Packers	Walt Landers	RB	Clark Atlanta	
Green Bay Packers	Paul Rudzinski	LB	Michigan State	
Green Bay Packers	Howard Sampson	DB	Arkansas	
Houston Oilers	Warren Moon^{‡}	QB	Washington	
Houston Oilers	Guido Merkens ^{†}	QB/WR	Sam Houston State	
Los Angeles Rams	Alan Caldwell	DB	North Carolina	
Los Angeles Rams	Preston Dennard	WR	New Mexico	
Los Angeles Rams	Dwayne O'Steen	CB	San Jose State	
Los Angeles Rams	Doug Smith ^{†}	C/G	Bowling Green	
Miami Dolphins	John Bristor	CB	Waynesburg	
Miami Dolphins	Zac Henderson	DB	Oklahoma	
Minnesota Vikings	Kevin Miller	WR	Louisville	
Minnesota Vikings	Harry Washington	WR	Colorado State	
New England Patriots	Tom Birney	K	Michigan State	
New England Patriots	Nick Lowery ^{†}	K	Dartmouth	
New Orleans Saints	Ed Burns	QB	Nebraska	
New York Jets	Bobby Jones	WR	Millikin	
Oakland Raiders	Mark Iwanowski	TE	Penn	
Oakland Raiders	Booker Russell	RB	Texas State	
Philadelphia Eagles	Ken Clarke	DT	Syracuse	
Philadelphia Eagles	Dan Rains	LB	Cincinnati	
Philadelphia Eagles	Brenard Wilson	S	Vanderbilt	
Pittsburgh Steelers	Thom Dornbrook	C	Kentucky	
Seattle Seahawks	Rufus Crawford	RB	Virginia State	
Seattle Seahawks	Kerry Justin	CB	Oregon State	
Seattle Seahawks	Brian Peets	TE	Pacific	
Washington Redskins	Cleo Montgomery	WR	Abilene Christian	
Washington Redskins	George Roberts	P	Virginia Tech	
Washington Redskins	J. T. Smith ^{†}	WR	North Texas	

== Hall of Famers ==
- Earl Campbell, running back from Texas, taken 1st round 1st overall by Houston Oilers

Inducted: Professional Football Hall of Fame class of 1991.

- Ozzie Newsome, wide receiver from Alabama, taken 1st round 23rd overall by Cleveland Browns

Inducted: Professional Football Hall of Fame class of 1999.

- James Lofton, wide receiver from Stanford, taken 1st round 6th overall by Green Bay Packers

Inducted: Professional Football Hall of Fame class of 2003.

- Warren Moon, quarterback from Washington, signed undrafted by Houston Oilers

Inducted: Professional Football Hall of Fame class of 2006.
