= 1977 Vanderbilt Commodores football team =

American college football season

1977 Vanderbilt Commodores football
- Conference: Southeastern Conference
- Record: 2–9 (0–6 SEC)
- Head coach: Fred Pancoast (3rd season)
- Offensive coordinator: Tom Goode (1st season)
- Home stadium: Dudley Field

1977 Southeastern Conference football standings
	Conf.					Overall
Team	W		L		T	W		L		T
No. 2 Alabama $	7	–	0	–	0	11	–	1	–	0
No. 6 Kentucky	6	–	0	–	0	10	–	1	–	0
Auburn	5	–	1	–	0	6	–	5	–	0
LSU	4	–	2	–	0	8	–	4	–	0
Florida	3	–	3	–	0	6	–	4	–	1
Georgia	2	–	4	–	0	5	–	6	–	0
Mississippi State	2	–	4	–	0	5	–	6	–	0
Ole Miss	3	–	4	–	0	6	–	5	–	0
Tennessee	1	–	5	–	0	4	–	7	–	0
Vanderbilt	0	–	6	–	0	2	–	9	–	0
$ – Conference champion; Kentucky ineligible for SEC championship due to NCAA probation. Mississippi State later forfeited all 1977 wins due to NCAA violations.; Rankings from AP Poll

The 1977 Vanderbilt Commodores football team represented Vanderbilt University as a member of the Southeastern Conference (SEC) during the 1977 NCAA Division I football season. Led by head coach third-year head coach Fred Pancoast, the Commodores compiled an overall record of 2–9 with a mark of 0–6 in conference play, placing last out of ten teams in the SEC. Vanderbilt played home games at Dudley Field in Nashville, Tennessee.

== Schedule ==
Date	Opponent	Site	Result	Attendance	Source
September 10	at No. 1 Oklahoma*	Oklahoma Memorial Stadium; Norman, OK	L 23–25	71,184	
September 17	at Wake Forest*	Groves Stadium; Winston-Salem, NC	W 3–0	24,250	
September 24	No. 10 Alabama	Dudley Field; Nashville, TN	L 12–24	34,694	
October 1	at Tulane*	Louisiana Superdome; New Orleans, LA	L 7–36	21,483	
October 8	No. 18 LSU	Dudley Field; Nashville, TN	L 15–28	24,000	
October 15	Georgia	Dudley Field; Nashville, TN (rivalry)	L 13–24	25,700	
October 22	at Ole Miss	Hemingway Stadium; Oxford, MS (rivalry)	L 14–26	32,300	
November 5	No. 7 Kentucky	Dudley Field; Nashville, TN (rivalry)	L 6–28	34,694	
November 12	at Air Force*	Falcon Stadium; Colorado Springs, CO	L 28–34	18,570	
November 19	Cincinnati*	Dudley Field; Nashville, TN	W 13–9	16,500	
November 26	at Tennessee	Neyland Stadium; Knoxville, TN (rivalry)	L 7–42	83,146	
*Non-conference game; Rankings from AP Poll released prior to the game

== Roster ==
1977 Vanderbilt Commodores football team roster
Players
Coaches
Offense

Pos.	#	Name	Class
RB	32	Preston Brown	So
WR	1	Martin Cox

Defense

Pos.	#	Name	Class
DT	77	Dennis Harrison	Sr
LB	86	Ed Smith	Jr
FS	22	Brenard Wilson	Sr

Special teams

Pos.	#	Name	Class

Head coach

- Fred Pancoast

Coordinators/assistant coaches

Legend

- (C) Team captain
- (S) Suspended
- (I) Ineligible
- Injured
- Redshirt
