= 1977 Kentucky Wildcats football team =

American college football season

1977 Kentucky Wildcats football
- Conference: Southeastern Conference

Ranking
- AP: No. 6
- Record: 10–1 (6–0 SEC)
- Head coach: Fran Curci (5th season)
- Offensive coordinator: Perry Moss (1st season)
- Defensive coordinator: Charlie Bailey (3rd season)
- Home stadium: Commonwealth Stadium

1977 Southeastern Conference football standings
	Conf.					Overall
Team	W		L		T	W		L		T
No. 2 Alabama $	7	–	0	–	0	11	–	1	–	0
No. 6 Kentucky	6	–	0	–	0	10	–	1	–	0
Auburn	5	–	1	–	0	6	–	5	–	0
LSU	4	–	2	–	0	8	–	4	–	0
Florida	3	–	3	–	0	6	–	4	–	1
Georgia	2	–	4	–	0	5	–	6	–	0
Mississippi State	2	–	4	–	0	5	–	6	–	0
Ole Miss	3	–	4	–	0	6	–	5	–	0
Tennessee	1	–	5	–	0	4	–	7	–	0
Vanderbilt	0	–	6	–	0	2	–	9	–	0
$ – Conference champion; Kentucky ineligible for SEC championship due to NCAA probation. Mississippi State later forfeited all 1977 wins due to NCAA violations.; Rankings from AP Poll

The 1977 Kentucky Wildcats football team represented the University of Kentucky in the 1977 NCAA Division I football season. The Wildcats scored 252 points while allowing 111 points. The Wildcats finished conference play undefeated but due to NCAA probation were not eligible for a share of the SEC championship or for postseason play. The Wildcats finished the season ranked #6 in the final AP Poll.

Kentucky's 33–13 victory over LSU was its third in four years over the Bayou Bengals, and the Wildcats' first at Tiger Stadium since 1949, when Bear Bryant was Kentucky's coach.

In the Border Battle, Kentucky beat Tennessee by a score of 21–17. Entering that game, Kentucky had seven injured starters unable to play, including quarterback Derrick Ramsey, whose arm was injured so badly he could not throw the football. Tennessee jumped out to a 17–14 lead when backup quarterback Mike Deaton completed a 36-yard pass to Felix Wilson; the injured Ramsey then entered the game and led Kentucky to a touchdown. Tennessee's offense then took the ball to Kentucky's 22-yard line but Tennessee quarterback Jimmy Streater fumbled due to a hit by Kentucky All-American defensive end Art Still, and linebacker Kelly Kirchbaum recovered the ball to preserve the win.

== Schedule ==
Date	Opponent	Rank	Site	Result	Attendance	Source
September 10	North Carolina*		Commonwealth Stadium; Lexington, KY	W 10–7	57,796	
September 17	at Baylor*		Baylor Stadium; Waco, TX	L 6–21	30,000	
September 24	No. 17 West Virginia*		Commonwealth Stadium; Lexington, KY	W 28–13	57,796	
October 1	at No. 4 Penn State*		Beaver Stadium; University Park, PA	W 24–20	62,196	
October 8	Mississippi State	No. 16	Commonwealth Stadium; Lexington, KY	W 23–7	57,914	
October 15	at No. 16 LSU	No. 12	Tiger Stadium; Baton Rouge, LA	W 33–13	71,495	
October 22	at Georgia	No. 8	Sanford Stadium; Athens, GA	W 33–0	59,100	
October 29	Virginia Tech*	No. 7	Commonwealth Stadium; Lexington, KY	W 32–0	57,914	
November 5	at Vanderbilt^{†}	No. 7	Dudley Field; Nashville, TN (rivalry)	W 28–6	34,694	
November 12	at Florida	No. 7	Florida Field; Gainesville, FL (rivalry)	W 14–7	58,125	
November 19	Tennessee	No. 7	Commonwealth Stadium; Lexington, KY (rivalry)	W 21–17	57,914	
*Non-conference game; ^{†}Homecoming; Rankings from AP Poll released prior to the game

== Personnel ==
1977 Kentucky Wildcats football team roster
Players
Coaches
Offense

Pos.	#	Name	Class
RB		Randy Brooks
QB		Mike Deaton
RB		Joe Dipre
OL		Tom Dornbrook
OL		Dan Fowler
OL		Will Grant
RB		Robert Hawkins
RB		Chris Hill
OL		Dave Hopewell
OL		Tom Kearns
TE		Greg Nord
RB		Henry Parks
TE		Scott Petersen
OL		Larry Petkovsek
QB		Derrick Ramsey
RB		Chuck Servino
RB		Rod Stewart
WR		Bill Tolston
WR		David Trosper
RB		Fred Williams
WR		Felix Wilson

Defense

Pos.	#	Name	Class
DL		Jerry Blanton
DB		Ritchie Boyd
DL		Bud Diehl
DB		Rich Hayden
DL		Richard Jaffe
LB		Kelly Kirchbaum
LB		Mike Martin
DB		Dallas Owens
DL		James Ramey
DB		Mike Siganos
DL		David Stephens
DE		Art Still
DT	83	Bob Winkel	Sr

Special teams

Pos.	#	Name	Class
K		Joe Bryant

Head coach

- Fran Curci

Coordinators/assistant coaches

Legend

- (C) Team captain
- (S) Suspended
- (I) Ineligible
- Injured
- Redshirt

== Season summary ==
=== at Penn State ===
Team	1	2	3	4	Total
• Kentucky	7	7	10	0	24
Penn St	10	10	0	0	20

- Date: October 1
- Location: Beaver Stadium, University Park, PA

Scoring summary
1	PSU	Bahr 20 yard field goal	PSU 3-0
1	PSU	Cefalo 75 yard punt return (Bahr kick)	PSU 10-0
1	KEN	Owens 23 yard interception return (Bryant kick)	PSU 10-7
2	KEN	Servino 1 yard run (Bryant kick)	KEN 14-10
2	PSU	Guman 29 yard pass from Fusina (Bahr kick)	PSU 17-14
2	PSU	Bahr 25 yard field goal	PSU 20-14
3	KEN	Bryant 30 yard field goal	PSU 20-17
3	KEN	Ramsey 1 yard run (Bryant kick)	KEN 24-20

=== at Georgia ===
Team	1	2	3	4	Total
• Kentucky	0	10	10	13	33
Georgia	0	0	0	0	0

- Date: October 22
- Location: Sanford Stadium
- Game attendance: 59,100

Scoring summary
Q2	KY	Bryant 51 yard field goal	KY 3–0
Q2	KY	Williams 1 yard pass from Ramsey (Bryant kick)	KY 10–0
Q3	KY	Tropser 17 yard pass from Ramsey (Bryant kick)	KY 17–0
Q3	KY	Bryant 51 yard field goal	KY 20–0
Q4	KY	Wilson 12 yard pass from Ramsey (Bryant kick)	KY 27–0
Q4	KY	Nord 10 yard pass from Deaton (kick failed)	KY 33–0

- The Prince of Wales (now Charles III) in attendance

=== Tennessee ===
Tennessee Volunteers (3–6) at #7 Kentucky Wildcats (9–1)

Quarter	1	2	3	4	Total
Tennessee	6	8	0	3	17
Kentucky	0	14	0	7	21

at Commonwealth Stadium, Lexington, Kentucky

- Date: November 19
- Game attendance: 57,914
- Box Score

Game information
First quarter
- UT – Kelsey Finch 4-yard run (kick failed). Tennessee 6–0.

Second quarter

- UK – Fred Williams 14-yard run (Joe Bryant kick). Kentucky 7–6.
- UK – Derrick Ramsey 1-yard run (Joe Bryant kick). Kentucky 14–6.
- UT – Kelsey Finch 9-yard run (Kelsey Finch run). Tie 14–14.

Third quarter

- No scoring

Fourth quarter

- UT – Jim Gaylor 57-yard field goal. Tennessee 17–14.
- UK – Derrick Ramsey 1-yard run (Joe Bryant kick). Kentucky 21–17.

External videos
- 1977 Tennessee at Kentucky – Game highlights

== Team players in the NFL ==
Player	Position	Rounds	Pick Overall	NFL club
Art Still	Defensive End	1	2	Kansas City Chiefs
Derrick Ramsey	Quarterback	5	136	Oakland Raiders
Mike Martin	Tackle	9	244	Chicago Bears
Will Grant	Center	10	255	Buffalo Bills
Dallas Owens	Defensive Back	10	275	Baltimore Colts
Jerry Blanton	Linebacker	11	282	Buffalo Bills

== Awards and honors ==
- Art Still, All-America honors
