= Tony Green (American football) =

American football player (born 1956)

No. 34
- Positions: Kickoff returner, running back

Personal information
- Born: September 26, 1956 (age 70); Rochester, New York, U.S.
- Listed height: 5 ft 9 in (1.75 m)
- Listed weight: 185 lb (84 kg)

Career information
- High school: Riverview (Sarasota, Florida)
- College: Florida
- NFL draft: 1978: 6th round, 159th overall pick

Career history
- Washington Redskins (1978); New York Giants (1979); Seattle Seahawks (1979)

Awards and highlights
- Second-team All-Pro (1978); Pro Bowl (1978); First-team All-SEC (1977)

Career NFL statistics
- Kickoff returns: 66
- Kickoff return yards: 1,521
- Punt returns: 61
- Punt return yards: 581
- Return touchdowns: 2
- Stats at Pro Football Reference

Anthony Edward Green (born September 26, 1956) is an American former professional football player who was a kickoff returner and running back in the National Football League (NFL) for two seasons during the late 1970s. Green played college football for the University of Florida, and thereafter he played professionally for the Washington Redskins, New York Giants and Seattle Seahawks of the NFL.

== Early life ==
Green was born in Rochester, New York in 1956. He attended Riverview High School in Sarasota, Florida, and he played high school football for the Riverview Rams.

== College career ==
Green accepted an athletic scholarship to attend the University of Florida in Gainesville, Florida, where he played for coach Doug Dickey's Florida Gators football team from 1974 to 1977. Memorably, he rushed eleven times for 178 yards (a 16.2-yard average) against the Maryland Terrapins in 1974, and ran 80 yards for a touchdown against the Mississippi State Bulldogs in 1977. He was a first-team All-Southeastern Conference (SEC) selection as a senior in 1977. Green finished his four-year college career with 2,590 rushing yards on 445 carries (a 5.8-yard average), 287 yards receiving, and 775 yards in punt and kickoff returns.

== Professional career ==
The Washington Redskins chose Green in the sixth round (159th pick overall) in the 1978 NFL draft, and he played for the Redskins for a single season in 1978. He had a remarkable rookie season as the Redskins' primary kick return specialist in 1978: forty-two punt returns for 440 yards, and thirty-four kickoff returns for 870 yards. Green was selected for the Pro Bowl as a kick returner.

He finished his NFL career in 1979, splitting the season between the New York Giants and the Seattle Seahawks.

== See also ==
- Florida Gators football, 1970–79
- List of Florida Gators in the NFL draft
- List of New York Giants players
- List of Seattle Seahawks players
- List of Washington Redskins players
