= Terry LeCount =

American football player (born 1956)

No. 80
- Position: Wide receiver

Personal information
- Born: July 9, 1956 (age 70); Jacksonville, Florida, U.S.
- Listed height: 5 ft 10 in (1.78 m)
- Listed weight: 178 lb (81 kg)

Career information
- High school: William M. Raines (Jacksonville)
- College: Florida
- NFL draft: 1978: 4th round, 91st overall pick

Career history
- San Francisco 49ers (1978–1979); Minnesota Vikings (1979–1984, 1987)

Career NFL statistics
- Receptions: 89
- Receiving yards: 1,354
- Touchdowns: 7
- Stats at Pro Football Reference

Terry Jerome LeCount (born July 9, 1956) is an American former professional football player who was a wide receiver in the National Football League (NFL) for nine seasons during the 1970s and 1980s. LeCount played college football for the University of Florida, and thereafter, he played professionally for the San Francisco 49ers and Minnesota Vikings of the NFL.

== Early life ==
LeCount was born in Jacksonville, Florida in 1956. He attended William M. Raines High School in Jacksonville, and he led the Raines Vikings high school football team to the Florida Class 4A state championship game as their quarterback in 1973. LeCount was a multi-sport athlete and flourished in track and field where he was champion of the 220 and 440-yard dashes.

== College career ==
LeCount accepted an athletic scholarship to attend the University of Florida in Gainesville, Florida, where he played for coach Doug Dickey's Florida Gators football team from 1974 to 1977. He was the second African-American, following Donald Gaffney, who played the quarterback position for the Gators, and led Dickey's "gatorbone" offense, a variation of the wishbone offense.

== Professional career ==
The San Francisco 49ers selected LeCount 91st overall in the fourth round in the 1978 NFL draft, and he played for the 49ers during his first NFL season in 1978 and part of his second season. The 49ers traded him to the Minnesota Vikings in 1979. LeCount was a Viking from 1979 through 1984, and again in 1987, after coming back from an injury. He finished his eight-season NFL career having played in seventy-two games, started nineteen of them, with eighty-nine receptions for 1,354 yards and seven touchdowns.

== Life after football ==
LeCount worked at ArchRival Sports at Strawberry Village in Mill Valley from 1988 to 2002. He was an assistant manager while coaching Track and Field at Tamalpais High School in Mill Valley, California.

LeCount married his former college sweetheart Valjean in 2002, and they live in Atlanta, Georgia. As of 2015, he works as a fan ambassador at the College Football Hall of Fame in downtown Atlanta. He formerly worked as a paraprofessional in the Decatur public schools.

== See also ==
- Florida Gators football, 1970–79
- History of the Minnesota Vikings
- History of the San Francisco 49ers
- List of Florida Gators in the NFL draft
