= Art Still =

American football player (born 1955)

No. 67, 72
- Position: Defensive end

Personal information
- Born: December 5, 1955 (age 70); Camden, New Jersey, U.S.
- Listed height: 6 ft 7 in (2.01 m)
- Listed weight: 253 lb (115 kg)

Career information
- High school: Camden
- College: Kentucky
- NFL draft: 1978: 1st round, 2nd overall pick

Career history
- Kansas City Chiefs (1978–1987); Buffalo Bills (1988–1989)

Awards and highlights
- 2× Second-team All-Pro (1980, 1984); 4× Pro Bowl (1980–1982, 1984); NFL All-Rookie Team (1978); Kansas City Chiefs Hall of Fame; Unanimous All-American (1977); 2× First-team All-SEC (1976, 1977)

Career NFL statistics
- Sacks: 80
- Interceptions: 1
- Fumble recoveries: 12
- Stats at Pro Football Reference
- College Football Hall of Fame

Arthur Barry Still (born December 5, 1955) is an American former professional football player who was a defensive end in the National Football League (NFL). He played college football for the Kentucky Wildcats, earning unanimous All-American honors in 1977. He played professionally for the Kansas City Chiefs (1978–1987) and the Buffalo Bills (1988–1989).

== College career ==
Still played at Kentucky under head coach Fran Curci and led the defense on the 1977 Kentucky Wildcats football team that finished 10-1 and ranked #6 in the final AP poll. On January 9, 2015, the National Football Foundation announced that Still would be inducted into the College Football Hall of Fame.

== Professional career ==
Still was the second overall player taken in the 1978 NFL draft and became an immediate starter for the Chiefs, making the NFL All-Rookie Team in 1978. In 1979 Still began to get more notice and was voted Second-team All-AFC by UPI. In 1980, Still recorded an unofficial 14.5 sacks, sacks were not officially counted until 1982, and was voted All-Pro and All-AFC as well as being named to the Pro Bowl. The following year, 1981, he was voted to his second Pro Bowl. In 1982, he made it three Pro Bowls in a row and was voted second-team All-AFC. In 1983 Still went on an all-vegetarian diet and played at 235 pounds, and it seemingly broke his string of post-season honors in the NFL. In 1984, he was back to 265 pounds and was Second-team All-Pro and a Pro Bowler. That season he recorded 14.5 sacks. In 1985, he played solidly but failed to make any All-Pro or All-AFC teams. However, in 1986 he recorded 10.5 sacks and was named First-team All-AFC as the Chiefs made the playoffs.

Still was a 4-time Pro Bowl selection, following the 1980-1982 and 1984 seasons, named the Kansas City Chiefs's Most Valuable Player twice (1980 and 1984). Still is third on the Chiefs all-time sack list with 48.5 and has also made 922 tackles and 11 fumble recoveries. He led the team in sacks on 6 occasions, twice registering 14.5 in a season and topped the team's tackle chart 3 times. He was traded to the Buffalo Bills in 1988 and played there for 2 seasons.

== Personal life ==
Art Still's younger sister, Valerie Still, is the all-time leading scorer and rebounder in University of Kentucky basketball history among men and women. His cousin is former Houston Texans defensive tackle Devon Still. He also has 3 sons and a daughter who are Kansas City Missouri fire fighters.
