= Ed Burns (American football) =

American football player (born 1954)

No. 11
- Position: Quarterback

Personal information
- Born: December 7, 1954 (age 71); Council Bluffs, Iowa, U.S.
- Listed height: 6 ft 3 in (1.91 m)
- Listed weight: 210 lb (95 kg)

Career information
- High school: Archbishop Rummel
- College: Nebraska
- NFL draft: 1978: undrafted

Career history
- New Orleans Saints (1978–1980)
- Stats at Pro Football Reference

Edward Joseph Burns (born December 7, 1954) is an American former professional football player who was a quarterback who played for the New Orleans Saints of the National Football League (NFL). He played college football for the Nebraska Cornhuskers.
