= 1977 Tennessee Volunteers football team =

American college football season

1977 Tennessee Volunteers football
- Conference: Southeastern Conference
- Record: 4–7 (1–5 SEC)
- Head coach: Johnny Majors (1st season)
- Offensive coordinator: Joe Avezzano (1st season)
- Defensive coordinator: Bobby Roper (1st season)
- Captains: Pert Jenkins; Greg Jones; Brent Watson
- Home stadium: Neyland Stadium

1977 Southeastern Conference football standings
	Conf.					Overall
Team	W		L		T	W		L		T
No. 2 Alabama $	7	–	0	–	0	11	–	1	–	0
No. 6 Kentucky	6	–	0	–	0	10	–	1	–	0
Auburn	5	–	1	–	0	6	–	5	–	0
LSU	4	–	2	–	0	8	–	4	–	0
Florida	3	–	3	–	0	6	–	4	–	1
Georgia	2	–	4	–	0	5	–	6	–	0
Mississippi State	2	–	4	–	0	5	–	6	–	0
Ole Miss	3	–	4	–	0	6	–	5	–	0
Tennessee	1	–	5	–	0	4	–	7	–	0
Vanderbilt	0	–	6	–	0	2	–	9	–	0
$ – Conference champion; Kentucky ineligible for SEC championship due to NCAA probation. Mississippi State later forfeited all 1977 wins due to NCAA violations.; Rankings from AP Poll

The 1977 Tennessee Volunteers football team (variously "Tennessee", "UT" or the "Vols") represented the University of Tennessee in the 1977 NCAA Division I football season. Playing as a member of the Southeastern Conference (SEC), the team was led by head coach Johnny Majors, in his first year, and played their home games at Neyland Stadium in Knoxville, Tennessee. They finished the season with a record of four wins and seven losses (4–7 overall, 1–5 in the SEC).

== Schedule ==
Date	Opponent	Site	Result	Attendance	Source
September 10	California*	Neyland Stadium; Knoxville, TN	L 17–27	84,421	
September 17	Boston College*	Neyland Stadium; Knoxville, TN	W 24–18	83,263	
September 24	Auburn	Neyland Stadium; Knoxville, TN	L 12–14	84,084	
October 1	Oregon State*	Neyland Stadium; Knoxville, TN	W 41–10	82,865	
October 8	Georgia Tech*	Neyland Stadium; Knoxville, TN (rivalry)	L 8–24	82,631	
October 15	at No. 4 Alabama	Legion Field; Birmingham, AL (Third Saturday in October)	L 10–24	71,000	
October 22	at No. 19 Florida	Florida Field; Gainesville, FL (rivalry)	L 17–27	67,711	
November 5	Memphis State*^{†}	Neyland Stadium; Knoxville, TN	W 27–14	82,573	
November 12	vs. Ole Miss	Liberty Bowl Memorial Stadium; Memphis, TN (rivalry)	L 14–43	50,259	
November 19	at No. 7 Kentucky	Commonwealth Stadium; Lexington, KY (rivalry)	L 17–21	57,914	
November 26	Vanderbilt	Neyland Stadium; Knoxville, TN (rivalry)	W 42–7	83,146	
*Non-conference game; ^{†}Homecoming; Rankings from AP Poll released prior to the game

== Personnel ==
1977 Tennessee Volunteers football team roster
Players
Coaches
Offense

Pos.	#	Name	Class
TE	87	Kyle Aguillard	So
G	73	Mike Cunningham	Sr
RB		Kelsey Finch
TE	85	Reggie Harper
QB	3	Joe Hough	Jr
OT	78	Tim Irwin	Fr
RB		Gary Moore
QB	4	Pat Ryan	Sr
C	56	Robert Shaw	Jr
QB	6	Jimmy Streater	So
OT	67	Phil Sutton	Jr
RB	35	Nate Sumpter	Jr

Defense

Pos.	#	Name	Class
LB	57	Terry Anderson	So
DB	26	Greg Gaines	Fr
S	14	Roland James	So
LB	44	Craig Puki	So
DB	20	Thomas Rowsey	Sr

Special teams

Pos.	#	Name	Class
P	28	Craig Colquitt	Sr
K	9	Jim Gaylor	Sr
KR		Joe Morgan

Head coach

- Johnny Majors

Coordinators/assistant coaches

- Joe Avezzano – Offensive coordinator/offensive line
- Bill Cox – Quarterbacks
- Bobby Jackson – Running backs
- Bob Harrison – Wide receivers
- Bobby Roper – Defensive coordinator/linebackers
- Jim Dyar – Defensive line
- Robbie Franklin – Outside linebacker
- Joe Madden – Defensive backs/assistant head coach

Legend

- (C) Team captain
- (S) Suspended
- (I) Ineligible
- Injured
- Redshirt

Roster

== Season summary ==
=== at Kentucky ===
Tennessee Volunteers (3–6) at #7 Kentucky Wildcats (9–1)

Quarter	1	2	3	4	Total
Tennessee	6	8	0	3	17
Kentucky	0	14	0	7	21

at Commonwealth Stadium, Lexington, Kentucky

- Date: November 19
- Game attendance: 57,914
- Box Score

Game information
First quarter
- UT – Kelsey Finch 4-yard run (kick failed). Tennessee 6–0.

Second quarter

- UK – Fred Williams 14-yard run (Joe Bryant kick). Kentucky 7–6.
- UK – Derrick Ramsey 1-yard run (Joe Bryant kick). Kentucky 14–6.
- UT – Kelsey Finch 9-yard run (Kelsey Finch run). Tie 14–14.

Third quarter

- No scoring

Fourth quarter

- UT – Jim Gaylor 57-yard field goal. Tennessee 17–14.
- UK – Derrick Ramsey 1-yard run (Joe Bryant kick). Kentucky 21–17.

External videos
- 1977 Tennessee at Kentucky – Game highlights

== Team players drafted into the NFL ==
Player	Position	Round	Pick	NFL club
Craig Colquitt	Punter	3	76	Pittsburgh Steelers
Jesse Turnbow	Defensive tackle	8	205	Cleveland Browns
Russ Williams	Defensive back	9	250	Dallas Cowboys
Brent Watson	Tackle	10	261	Cleveland Browns
Pat Ryan	Quarterback	11	281	New York Jets
