= Henry Bradley (American football) =

American football player (born 1953)

No. 91
- Position: Defensive tackle

Personal information
- Born: September 4, 1953 (age 73); St. Joseph, Louisiana, U.S.
- Listed height: 6 ft 2 in (1.88 m)
- Listed weight: 261 lb (118 kg)

Career information
- High school: Davidson (LA)
- College: Alcorn State
- NFL draft: 1978: 9th round, 237th overall pick

Career history
- Cleveland Browns (1979–1982)

Career NFL statistics
- Games played: 43
- Games started: 37
- Fumble recoveries: 3
- Stats at Pro Football Reference

Henry Averson Bradley (born September 4, 1953) is an American former professional football player who was a defensive tackle in the National Football League (NFL). He played college football for the Alcorn State Braves. He was selected by the San Diego Chargers in the ninth round of the 1978 NFL draft. Bradley would end up signing as a free agent and play for the Cleveland Browns.
