= Blake Whitlatch =

American football player (born 1955)

No. 57
- Position: Linebacker

Personal information
- Born: October 13, 1955 (age 71); Baton Rouge, Louisiana, U.S.
- Listed height: 6 ft 1 in (1.85 m)
- Listed weight: 233 lb (106 kg)

Career information
- High school: Baton Rouge (LA) Broadmoor
- College: LSU
- NFL draft: 1978: 9th round, 248th overall pick

Career history
- San Diego Chargers (1978)*; New York Jets (1978); New York Giants (1979)*
- * Offseason or practice squad member only
- Stats at Pro Football Reference

Blake Whitlatch (born October 13, 1955) is an American former professional football player who was a linebacker in the National Football League (NFL) for one season with the New York Jets. He played in four games for the Jets during the 1978 season. He was selected by the San Diego Chargers in the ninth round of the 1978 NFL draft. Whitlatch was born in Baton Rouge, Louisiana and attended Broadmoor High School. He attended college at Louisiana State University, where he played college football for the LSU Tigers football team.
