= Scot Brantley =

American football player (born 1958)

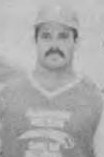
- Brantley, c. 1982

No. 52
- Position: Linebacker

Personal information
- Born: February 24, 1958 (age 68); Chester, South Carolina, U.S.
- Listed height: 6 ft 1 in (1.85 m)
- Listed weight: 230 lb (104 kg)

Career information
- High school: Ocala (FL) Forest
- College: Florida
- NFL draft: 1980: 3rd round, 76th overall pick

Career history
- Tampa Bay Buccaneers (1980–1987); Cincinnati Bengals (1988)*; Miami Dolphins (1988)*
- * Offseason or practice squad member only

Awards and highlights
- 2× First-team All-SEC (1977, 1978); University of Florida Athletic Hall of Fame; Florida–Georgia Hall of Fame

Career NFL statistics
- Interceptions: 8
- Sacks: 5
- Fumble recoveries: 4
- Stats at Pro Football Reference

Scot Eugene Brantley (born February 24, 1958) is an American radio and television sports broadcaster and former college and professional football player who was a linebacker in the National Football League (NFL) for eight seasons during the 1980s. Brantley played college football for the University of Florida, and thereafter, he played professionally for the Tampa Bay Buccaneers of the NFL.

== Early life ==
Brantley was born in Chester, South Carolina, in 1958. He attended Forest High School in Ocala, Florida, where he played high school football for the Forest Wildcats. Brantley was a starting linebacker on the Wildcats varsity as a freshman, and as a junior and senior, he was a member of the Wildcats' 1974 and 1975 Florida Class 3A high school state championship teams. Brantley was twice named a high school All-American by Parade magazine, and was one of the mostly highly sought-after college recruits in the country in 1975. He was also a standout outfielder for the Wildcats baseball team, and was drafted by the New York Mets despite having already signed with the Florida Gators to play college football.

In 2007, thirty-one years after he graduated from high school, the Florida High School Athletic Association (FHSAA) recognized Brantley as one of the "100 Greatest Players of the First 100 Years" of Florida high school football.

== College career ==
Brantley accepted an athletic scholarship to attend the University of Florida in Gainesville, Florida, where he played for coach Doug Dickey and coach Charley Pell's Florida Gators football teams from 1976 to 1979. Brantley was a first-team All-Southeastern Conference (SEC) selection in 1977 and 1978 and received honorable mention All-American honors in 1977 and 1978. His senior season in 1979 was cut short by a brain injury after he was knocked unconscious in the Gators' first home game, which was a severe blow to a team in the first year of a coaching transition. Brantley led the Gators in tackles during the 1976 and 1978 seasons, and his career total of 467 tackles still ranks second on the Gators' all-time records list.

Brantley was inducted into the University of Florida Athletic Hall of Fame as a "Gator Great" in 1990, and the Florida-Georgia Hall of Fame in 2010. In a 2006 article series, the sports editors of The Gainesville Sun recognized him as No. 25 among the top 100 Gators from the first 100 Florida football seasons.

== Professional career ==
After his college career, the Tampa Bay Buccaneers selected Brantley in the third round (seventy-sixth pick overall) of the 1980 NFL draft, and he played linebacker for the Buccaneers for his entire eight-year NFL career from 1980 to 1987. Brantley became a regular starter in his third season in 1982, played in 114 games, started in seventy-one of them, and had eight interceptions in his career.

== Life after the NFL ==
=== Radio broadcast career ===
Following his professional football career, Brantley pursued a career in sports broadcasting. He joined the Florida Football Radio Network as a pre-game and halftime host and, from 1997 through 2004, as the color analyst alongside long-time Florida play-by-play man Mick Hubert. Brantley also served several seasons as the broadcast partner of Gene Deckerhoff on the Tampa Bay Buccaneers Radio Network, and for several years, he would work a college game on Saturday and take an overnight trip to work an NFL game on Sunday. He appeared on Gators football radio broadcasts from 1997 through 2011 and on Bucs broadcasts from 1999 through 2005.

Brantley also hosted or co-hosted several sports talk radio shows in the Tampa market from the mid-1990s through the early 2010s, including stints alongside Steve Duemig and the Fabulous Sports Babe, among many others. Brantley also co-hosted several Gator-themed sports talk shows in the Gainesville market, and after moving from Tampa to Ocala, Florida in 2012, he worked in North Central Florida radio exclusively.

=== Medical issues ===
Brantley suffers from a long list of lingering ailments dating back to his playing days which required later surgery, including multiple fused vertebrae in his neck and back and knee and hip replacements. He suffered two small strokes in 2008, causing him to lose partial sight in his left eye and require serious heart surgery.

Brantley was diagnosed with dementia in 2012 but did not publicly reveal his condition. While still working in radio in 2013, Brantley told an interviewer that he had difficulty remembering names and events and had to write down detailed lists of topics before going on the air. At the time, he also expressed worry that the many concussions he suffered while playing football would continue to impact his health, stating, "I never knew — none of us ever knew — that [playing football] could cause long-term problems for your brain. We had no idea that you might end up with Parkinson's or Alzheimer's or that you would have guys killing themselves. Never. We never knew that might happen." His condition continued to deteriorate in the following years, leading to the end of his radio career.

In 2018, it was revealed that Brantley was suffering from Alzheimer's disease. In May 2018, he appeared on an episode of Real Sports on HBO titled "Unsettled" in which host Bryant Gumbel interviewed disabled former NFL players whose claims to the league's concussion settlement had been denied. In the episode, Brantley and his wife explained that he had difficulty walking and performing everyday tasks and suffered from serious memory issues which were demonstrated on camera when he expressed confusion about his age.

== Gator football family ==
Brantley's nephew, John Brantley, IV, was the Florida Gators' starting quarterback for the 2010 and 2011 seasons. His brother, John Brantley, III, was the Gators' starting quarterback in 1978.

== See also ==
- Florida Gators football, 1970–79
- History of the Tampa Bay Buccaneers
- List of Florida Gators in the NFL draft
- List of University of Florida Athletic Hall of Fame members
