= 1977 Alabama Crimson Tide football team =

American college football season

1977 Alabama Crimson Tide football

National champion (Football Research) SEC champion Sugar Bowl champion

Sugar Bowl, W 35–6 vs. Ohio State
- Conference: Southeastern Conference

Ranking
- Coaches: No. 2
- AP: No. 2
- Record: 11–1 (7–0 SEC)
- Head coach: Bear Bryant (20th season)
- Offensive coordinator: Mal Moore (3rd season)
- Offensive scheme: Wishbone
- Defensive coordinator: Ken Donahue (4th season)
- Base defense: 5–2
- Captains: Mike Tucker; Ozzie Newsome
- Home stadium: Bryant–Denny Stadium; Legion Field

1977 Southeastern Conference football standings
	Conf.					Overall
Team	W		L		T	W		L		T
No. 2 Alabama $	7	–	0	–	0	11	–	1	–	0
No. 6 Kentucky	6	–	0	–	0	10	–	1	–	0
Auburn	5	–	1	–	0	6	–	5	–	0
LSU	4	–	2	–	0	8	–	4	–	0
Florida	3	–	3	–	0	6	–	4	–	1
Georgia	2	–	4	–	0	5	–	6	–	0
Mississippi State	2	–	4	–	0	5	–	6	–	0
Ole Miss	3	–	4	–	0	6	–	5	–	0
Tennessee	1	–	5	–	0	4	–	7	–	0
Vanderbilt	0	–	6	–	0	2	–	9	–	0
$ – Conference champion; Kentucky ineligible for SEC championship due to NCAA probation. Mississippi State later forfeited all 1977 wins due to NCAA violations.; Rankings from AP Poll

The 1977 Alabama Crimson Tide football team (variously "Alabama", "UA" or "Bama") represented the University of Alabama in the 1977 NCAA Division I football season. It was the Crimson Tide's 83rd overall and 44th season as a member of the Southeastern Conference (SEC). The team was led by head coach Bear Bryant, in his 20th year, and played their home games at Bryant–Denny Stadium in Tuscaloosa and Legion Field in Birmingham, Alabama. They finished season with eleven wins and one loss (11–1 overall, 7–0 in the SEC), as SEC champions and with a 35–6 victory over Ohio State in the Sugar Bowl.

== Schedule ==
Date	Opponent	Rank	Site	TV	Result	Attendance	Source
September 10	Ole Miss	No. 6	Legion Field; Birmingham, AL (rivalry)		W 34–13	74,324	
September 17	at Nebraska*	No. 4	Memorial Stadium; Lincoln, NE	ABC	L 24–31	75,899	
September 24	at Vanderbilt	No. 10	Dudley Field; Nashville, TN		W 24–12	34,694	
October 1	Georgia	No. 10	Bryant–Denny Stadium; Tuscaloosa, AL (rivalry)		W 18–10	60,210	
October 8	at No. 1 USC*	No. 7	Los Angeles Memorial Coliseum; Los Angeles, CA	ABC	W 21–20	63,140	
October 15	Tennessee	No. 4	Legion Field; Birmingham, AL (Third Saturday in October)		W 24–10	71,000	
October 22	Louisville*^{†}	No. 3	Bryant–Denny Stadium; Tuscaloosa, AL		W 55–6	60,210	
October 29	at Mississippi State	No. 2	Mississippi Veterans Memorial Stadium; Jackson, MS (rivalry)		W 37–7	47,500	
November 5	at No. 18 LSU	No. 2	Tiger Stadium; Baton Rouge, LA (rivalry)	ABC	W 24–3	65,377	
November 12	Miami (FL)*	No. 2	Bryant–Denny Stadium; Tuscaloosa, AL		W 36–0	57,422	
November 26	vs. Auburn	No. 2	Legion Field; Birmingham, AL (Iron Bowl)		W 48–21	69,721	
January 2, 1978	vs. No. 9 Ohio State*	No. 3	Louisiana Superdome; New Orleans, LA (Sugar Bowl)	ABC	W 35–6	76,811	
*Non-conference game; ^{†}Homecoming; Rankings from AP Poll Poll released prior to the game; Source:

== Game summaries ==
=== Ole Miss ===
Ole Miss Rebels (1–0) at #6 Alabama Crimson Tide (0–0)

Quarter	1	2	3	4	Total
Ole Miss	6	7	0	0	13
Alabama	13	14	0	7	34

at Legion Field, Birmingham, Alabama

- Date: September 10
- Game attendance: 74,324

Game information

First quarter

- ALA – Mitch Ferguson 6-yard run (Roger Chapman kick). Alabama 7–0.
- MISS – Bobby Garner 1-yard run (kick failed). Alabama 7–6.
- ALA – Jeff Rutledge 8-yard run (pass failed). Alabama 13–6.

Second quarter

- ALA – Tony Nathan 1-yard run (Roger Chapman kick). Alabama 20–6.
- MISS – Curtis Weathers 36-yard pass from Bobby Garner (Carl Langley kick). Alabama 20–13.
- ALA – Steve Whitman 3-yard run (Roger Chapman kick). Alabama 27–13.

Third quarter

- No scoring

Fourth quarter

- ALA – Tony Nathan 1-yard run (Roger Chapman kick). Alabama 34–13.

Top passers

- MISS – Bobby Garner – 6/9, 104 yards, TD
- ALA – Jeff Rutledge – 7/8, 215 yards

Top rushers

- MISS – James Storey – 13 rushes, 43 yards
- ALA – Johnny Davis – 18 rushes, 90 yards

Top receivers

- MISS – Curtis Weathers – 3 receptions, 62 yards, TD
- ALA – Ozzie Newsome – 3 receptions, 93 yards

=== At Nebraska ===
#4 Alabama Crimson Tide (1–0) at Nebraska Cornhuskers (0-1)

Quarter	1	2	3	4	Total
Alabama	7	10	0	7	24
Nebraska	10	7	7	7	31

at Memorial Stadium, Lincoln, Nebraska

- Date: September 17
- Game attendance: 75,899
- TV: ABC

Game information

First quarter

- NEB – Billy Todd 29-yard field goal, 10:38. Nebraska 3–0.
- ALA – Jeff Rutledge 7-yard run (Roger Chapman kick), 7:36. Alabama 7–3.
- NEB – Rick Berns 7-yard pass from Randy Garcia (Billy Todd kick), 0:31. Nebraska 10–7.

Second quarter

- ALA – Tony Nathan 2-yard run (Roger Chapman kick), 10:45. Alabama 14–10.
- NEB – Rick Berns 2-yard run (Billy Todd kick), 3:26. Nebraska 17–14.
- ALA – Roger Chapman 37-yard field goal, 0:10. Tie 17–17.

Third quarter

- NEB – Curtis Craig 17-yard run (Billy Todd kick), 10:54. Nebraska 24–17.

Fourth quarter

- ALA – Tony Nathan 1-yard run (Roger Chapman kick), 12:24. Tie 24–24.
- NEB – Rick Berns 2-yard run (Billy Todd kick), 7:12. Nebraska 31–24.

Top passers

- ALA – Jeff Rutledge – 13/31, 198 yards, 5 INT
- NEB – Randy Garcia – 7/11, 123 yards, TD, INT

Top rushers

- ALA – Tony Nathan – 16 rushes, 90 yards, 2 TD
- NEB – Rick Berns – 23 rushes, 128 yards, 2 TD

Top receivers

- ALA – Ozzie Newsome – 8 receptions, 132 yards
- NEB – I.M. Hipp – 1 reception, 53 yards

Alabama went into Lincoln with Nebraska still feeling the sting of a home loss to Washington State. While the Crimson Tide slightly exceeded the Cornhuskers in offensive production, five interceptions helped give Nebraska the edge to pull off the stunning upset.

=== At Vanderbilt ===
#10 Alabama Crimson Tide (1–1) at Vanderbilt Commodores (1–1)

Quarter	1	2	3	4	Total
Alabama	10	6	0	8	24
Vanderbilt	6	0	0	6	12

at Dudley Field, Nashville, Tennessee

- Date: September 24
- Game attendance: 34,694

Game information

First quarter

- ALA – Roger Chapman 20-yard field goal. Alabama 3–0.
- VAN – Greg Martin 37-yard field goal. Tie 3–3.
- ALA – Tony Nathan 1-yard run (Roger Chapman kick). Alabama 10–3.
- VAN – Greg Martin 29-yard field goal. Alabama 10–6.

Second quarter

- ALA – Roger Chapman 46-yard field goal. Alabama 13–6.
- ALA – Roger Chapman 34-yard field goal. Alabama 16–6.

Third quarter

- No scoring

Fourth quarter

- ALA – Safety, Vanderbilt kicks ball out of end zone. Alabama 18–6.
- VAN – George Dickerson 36-yard pass from Mike Wright (kick failed). Alabama 18–12.
- ALA – Johnny Davis 2-yard run (run failed). Alabama 24–12.

Top passers

- ALA – Jeff Rutledge – 2/6, 28 yards
- VAN – Mike Wright – 4/6, 58 yards, TD

Top rushers

- ALA – Johnny Davis – 24 rushes, 153 yards, TD
- VAN – Randy Hampton – 10 rushes, 39 yards

Top receivers

- ALA – Ozzie Newsome – 2 receptions, 28 yards
- VAN – Hal Kemp – 3 receptions, 25 yards

=== Georgia ===
Georgia Bulldogs (2–1) at #10 Alabama Crimson Tide (2–1)

Quarter	1	2	3	4	Total
Georgia	3	0	0	7	10
Alabama	9	0	6	3	18

at Legion Field, Birmingham, Alabama

- Date: October 1
- Game attendance: 60,210

Game information

First quarter

- ALA – Safety, Georgia punter drops ball out of end zone. Alabama 2–0.
- ALA – Johnny Davis 1-yard run (Roger Chapman kick). Alabama 9–0.
- UGA – Rex Robinson 53-yard field goal. Alabama 9–3.

Second quarter

- No scoring

Third quarter

- ALA – Roger Chapman 22-yard field goal. Alabama 12–3.
- ALA – Roger Chapman 29-yard field goal. Alabama 15–3.

Fourth quarter

- UGA – Willie McClendon 7-yard run (Rex Robinson kick). Alabama 15–10.
- ALA – Roger Chapman 32-yard field goal. Alabama 18–10.

Top passers

- UGA – Randy Cook – 5/16, 67 yards, 2 INT
- ALA – Jeff Rutledge – 3/5, 33 yards

Top rushers

- UGA – Kevin McLee – 13 rushes, 45 yards
- ALA – Johnny Davis – 18 rushes, 66 yards, TD

Top receivers

- UGA – Mark Hodge – 2 receptions, 34 yards
- ALA – Ozzie Newsome – 2 receptions, 20 yards

=== At USC ===
#7 Alabama Crimson Tide (3–1) at #1 USC Trojans (4–0)

Quarter	1	2	3	4	Total
Alabama	0	0	7	14	21
USC	3	0	3	14	20

at Los Angeles Memorial Coliseum, Los Angeles, California

- Date: October 8
- Game attendance: 63,140
- TV: ABC

Game information

First quarter

- USC – Frank Jordan 32-yard field goal. USC 3–0.

Second quarter

- No scoring

Third quarter

- ALA – Johnny Davis 2-yard run (Roger Chapman kick). Alabama 7–3.
- USC – Frank Jordan 23-yard field goal. Alabama 7–6.

Fourth quarter

- ALA – Tony Nathan 1-yard run (Roger Chapman kick). Alabama 14–6.
- ALA – Tony Nathan 13-yard run (Roger Chapman kick). Alabama 21–6.
- USC – Calvin Sweeney 10-yard pass from Rob Hertel (pass good). Alabama 21–14.
- USC – Lynn Cain 1-yard run (pass failed). Alabama 21–20.

Top passers

- ALA – Jeff Rutledge – 2/4, 8 yards
- USC – Rob Hertel – 18/30, 239 yards, TD, 2 INT

Top rushers

- ALA – Tony Nathan – 18 rushes, 76 yards, 2 TD
- USC – Charles White – 15 rushes, 63 yards

Top receivers

- ALA – Lou Ikner – 1 reception, 5 yards
- USC – Randy Simmrin – 6 receptions, 120 yards

=== Tennessee ===
Tennessee Volunteers (2–3) at #4 Alabama Crimson Tide (4–1)

Quarter	1	2	3	4	Total
Tennessee	3	0	7	0	10
Alabama	3	13	8	0	24

at Legion Field, Birmingham, Alabama

- Date: October 15
- Game attendance: 71,000

Game information

First quarter

- ALA – Roger Chapman 20-yard field goal. Alabama 3–0.
- TEN – Jim Gaylor 41-yard field goal. Tie 3–3.

Second quarter

- ALA – Jeff Rutledge 4-yard run (Roger Chapman kick). Alabama 10–3.
- ALA – Jeff Rutledge 9-yard run (kick failed). Alabama 16–3.

Third quarter

- ALA – Ozzie Newsome 39-yard pass from Jeff Rutledge (run good). Alabama 24–3.
- TEN – Kelsey Finch 13-yard pass from Joe Hough (Jim Gaylor kick). Alabama 24–10.

Fourth quarter

- No scoring

Top passers

- TEN – Joe Hough – 6/13,76 yards, TD, INT
- ALA – Jeff Rutledge – 5/8, 82 yards, TD

Top rushers

- TEN – Kelsey Finch – 8 rushes, 53 yards
- ALA – Johnny Davis – 18 rushes, 103 yards

Top receivers

- TEN – Reggie Harper – 3 receptions, 43 yards
- ALA – Ozzie Newsome – 2 receptions, 61 yards, TD

=== Louisville ===
Louisville Cardinals (3–2–1) at #3 Alabama Crimson Tide (5–1)

Quarter	1	2	3	4	Total
Louisville	0	0	6	0	6
Alabama	14	13	14	14	55

at Bryant–Denny Stadium, Tuscaloosa, Alabama

- Game attendance: 60,210

Game information

First quarter

- ALA – Ozzie Newsome 67-yard pass from Jeff Rutledge (kick failed). Alabama 6–0.
- ALA – Donnie Faust 2-yard run (run good). Alabama 14–0.

Second quarter

- ALA – Tony Nathan 71-yard run (kick failed). Alabama 20–0.
- ALA – Steve Whitman 10-yard run (Roger Chapman kick). Alabama 27–0.

Third quarter

- ALA – Ozzie Newsome 32-yard pass from Jeff Rutledge (Roger Chapman kick). Alabama 34–0.
- ALA – Keith Pugh 32-yard pass from Kevin Jones (Roger Chapman kick). Alabama 41–0.
- LOU – Randy Butler 1-yard run (kick failed). Alabama 41–6.

Fourth quarter

- ALA – Tim Travis 5-yard pass from Steadman Shealy (Roger Chapman kick). Alabama 48–6.
- ALA – John Turpin 5-yard run (Roger Chapman kick). Alabama 55–6.

Top passers

- LOU – Randy Butler – 4/11, 48 yards
- ALA – Jeff Rutledge – 3/3, 124 yards, 2 TD

Top rushers

- LOU – Calvin Prince – 15 rushes, 100 yards
- ALA – Tony Nathan – 4 rushes, 85 yards, TD

Top receivers

- LOU – Marc Mitchell – 3 receptions, 31 yards
- ALA – Ozzie Newsome – 3 receptions, 124 yards, 2 TD

=== At Mississippi State ===
#2 Alabama Crimson Tide (6–1) at Mississippi State Bulldogs (3–4)

Quarter	1	2	3	4	Total
Alabama	14	7	13	3	37
Mississippi State	0	7	0	0	7

at Mississippi Veterans Memorial Stadium, Jackson, Mississippi

- Date: October 29
- Game attendance: 47,500

Game information

First quarter

- ALA – Tony Nathan 59-yard run (Roger Chapman kick). Alabama 6–0.
- ALA – Donnie Faust 1-yard run (Roger Chapman kick. Alabama 14–0.

Second quarter

- MSU – James Otis Doss 2-yard run (Dave Marler kick). Alabama 14–7.
- ALA – Keith Pugh 30-yard pass from Jeff Rutledge (Roger Chapman kick). Alabama 21–7.

Third quarter

- ALA – Johnny Davis 1-yard run (Roger Chapman kick). Alabama 28–7.
- ALA – Steadman Shealy 1-yard run (kick failed). Alabama 34–7.

Fourth quarter

- ALA – Roger Chapman 37-yard field goal. Alabama 37–7.

Top passers

- ALA – Jeff Rutledge – 5/8, 95 yards, TD
- MSU – Bruce Threadgill – 10/20, 189 yards, 2 INT

Top rushers

- ALA – Tony Nathan – 7 rushes, 115 yards, TD
- MSU – Dennis Johnson – 8 rushes, 23 yards

Top receivers

- ALA – Keith Pugh – 3 receptions, 59 yards, TD
- MSU – Mardye McDole – 7 receptions, 96 yards

=== At LSU ===
#2 Alabama Crimson Tide (7–1) at #18 LSU Tigers (5–2)

Quarter	1	2	3	4	Total
Alabama	3	7	7	7	24
LSU	0	3	0	0	3

at Tiger Stadium, Baton Rouge, Louisiana

- Date: November 5
- Game attendance: 65,377
- TV: ABC

Game information

First quarter

- ALA – Roger Chapman 44-yard field goal. Alabama 3–0.

Second quarter

- LSU – Mike Conway 31-yard field goal. Tie 3–3.
- ALA – Tony Nathan 1-yard run (Roger Chapman kick). Alabama 10–3.

Third quarter

- ALA – Tony Nathan 1-yard run (Roger Chapman kick). Alabama 17–3.

Fourth quarter

- ALA – Keith Pugh 20-yard pass from Tony Nathan (Roger Chapman kick). Alabama 24–3.

Top passers

- ALA – Jeff Rutledge – 4/7, 62 yards
- LSU – David Woodley – 3/8, 17 yards

Top rushers

- ALA – Johnny Davis – 23 rushes, 126 yards
- LSU – Charles Alexander – 22 rushes, 110 yards

Top receivers

- ALA – Ozzie Newsome – 4 receptions, 62 yards
- LSU – Mike Quintela – 1 reception, 9 yards

=== Miami (FL) ===
Miami (FL) Hurricanes (3–5) at #2 Alabama Crimson Tide (8–1)

Quarter	1	2	3	4	Total
Miami (FL)	0	0	0	0	0
Alabama	0	15	7	14	36

at Bryant–Denny Stadium, Tuscaloosa, Alabama

- Date: November 12
- Game attendance: 57,422

Game information

First quarter

- No scoring

Second quarter

- ALA – Rick Neal 5-yard pass from Jeff Rutledge (kick failed). Alabama 6–0.
- ALA – Tony Nathan 1-yard run (run failed). Alabama 12–0.
- ALA – Roger Chapman 27-yard field goal. Alabama 15–0.

Third quarter

- ALA – Rick Neal 7-yard pass from Jeff Rutledge (Alan McElroy kick). Alabama 22–0.

Fourth quarter

- ALA – Tony Nathan 2-yard run (Alan McElroy kick). Alabama 29–0.
- ALA – Kevin Jones 12-yard run (Alan McElroy kick). Alabama 36–0.

Top passers

- MIA – Kenny McMillian – 2/8, 15 yards, INT
- ALA – Jeff Rutledge – 9/14, 165 yards, 2 TD

Top rushers

- MIA – Chris Hobbs – 13 rushes, 43 yards
- ALA – Johnny Davis – 11 rushes, 84 yards

Top receivers

- MIA – Pat Walker – 1 reception, 11 yards
- ALA – Ozzie Newsome – 4 receptions, 106 yards

=== Vs. Auburn ===
#2 Alabama Crimson Tide (9–1) vs. Auburn Tigers (5–5)

Quarter	1	2	3	4	Total
Alabama	0	14	14	20	48
Auburn	7	0	0	14	21

at Legion Field, Birmingham, Alabama

- Date: November 26
- Game attendance: 69,721

Game information

First quarter

- AUB – Joe Cribbs 87-yard run (Jorge Portela kick). Auburn 7–0.

Second quarter

- ALA – Bruce Bolton 30-yard pass from Jeff Rutledge (Roger Chapman kick). Tie 7–7.
- ALA – Johnny Davis 12-yard run (Roger Chapman kick). Alabama 14–7.

Third quarter

- ALA – Tony Nathan 1-yard run (Roger Chapman kick). Alabama 21–7.
- ALA – Tony Nathan 2-yard run (Roger Chapman kick). Alabama 28–7.

Fourth quarter

- AUB – Byron Franklin 74-yard pass from Charlie Trotman (Jorge Portela kick). Alabama 28–14.
- ALA – Mitch Ferguson 1-yard run (Roger Chapman kick). Alabama 35–14.
- ALA – Ozzie Newsome 42-yard pass from Jeff Rutledge (kick failed). Alabama 41–14.
- ALA – Steadman Shealy 15-yard run (Barry Smith kick). Alabama 48–14.
- AUB – William Andrews 3-yard run (Jorge Portela kick). Alabama 48–21.

Top passers

- ALA – Jeff Rutledge – 9/13, 193 yards, 2 TD
- AUB – Charlie Trotman – 4/9, 135 yards, TD, INT

Top rushers

- ALA – Johnny Davis – 20 rushes, 104 yards, TD
- AUB – Joe Cribbs – 15 rushes, 133 yards, TD

Top receivers

- ALA – Ozzie Newsome – 4 receptions, 123 yards, TD
- AUB – Byron Franklin – 1 reception, 74 yards, TD

- Jeff Rutledge 15 rushes, 102 yards

=== Sugar Bowl (vs. Ohio State) ===
Sugar Bowl: #3 Alabama Crimson Tide (10–1) vs. #9 Ohio State Buckeyes (9–2)

Quarter	1	2	3	4	Total
Ohio State	0	0	0	6	6
Alabama	0	13	8	14	35

at Louisiana Superdome, New Orleans, Louisiana

- Date: January 2, 1978
- Game weather: Indoors (dome)
- Game attendance: 76,811
- Referee: Percy Penn
- TV announcers (ABC): Keith Jackson and Ara Parseghian

Game information

First quarter

- No scoring

Second quarter

- ALA – Tony Nathan 1-yard run (Roger Chapman kick). Alabama 7–0.
- ALA – Bruce Bolton 27-yard pass from Jeff Rutledge (kick failed). Alabama 13–0.

Third quarter

- ALA – Rick Neal 3-yard pass from Jeff Rutledge (pass good). Alabama 21–0.

Fourth quarter

- OSU – James Harrell 38-yard pass from Rod Gerald (run failed). Alabama 21–6.
- ALA – Major Ogilvie 1-yard run (Roger Chapman kick). Alabama 28–6.
- ALA – Johnny Davis 5-yard run (Roger Chapman kick). Alabama 35–6.

Top passers

- OSU – Rod Gerald – 7/17, 103 yards, TD, 3 INT
- ALA – Jeff Rutledge – 8/11, 109 yards, 2 TD

Top rushers

- OSU – Ron Springs – 10 rushes, 74 yards
- ALA – Johnny Davis – 24 rushes, 95 yards, TD

Top receivers

- OSU – James Harrell – 1 reception, 38 yards, TD
- ALA – Ozzie Newsome – 2 receptions, 45 yards

== Personnel ==
1977 Alabama Crimson Tide football team roster
Players
Coaches
Offense

Pos.	#	Name	Class
OT	78	Buddy Aydelette	So
WR	32	Bruce Bolton
OL		Jim Bunch
RB	20	Pete Cavan
RB	40	Johnny Crow
G		Bob Cryder	Sr
FB	38	Johnny Davis	Sr
RB		Mike English
RB		Donnie Faust
RB		Mitch Ferguson
QB		Alan Gray
OL		Louis Green
RB	30	Lou Ikner
QB		Kevin Jones
RB	22	Tony Nathan	Jr
WR	8	Rick Neal
WR	82	Ozzie Newsome (C)	Sr
QB		Jack O'Rear
DB	18	Ricky Tucker
RB	42	Major Ogilvie
WR	4	Keith Pugh
QB	11	Jeff Rutledge	Jr
QB	10	Steadman Shealy
C	57	Dwight Stephenson	So
OL		Chip Tilman
TE	88	Tim Travis	So
RB		John Turpin
FB	45	Steve Whitman	So

Defense

Pos.	#	Name	Class
DB		Phil Allman
DL		William Davis
LB		Rickey Gilliland
DT	94	Wayne Hamilton	So
DT		Terry Jones	Sr
DE	39	E. J. Junior	Fr
DL		John Knox
DB		Mike Kramer
LB	77	Barry Krauss
DB		Murray Legg
DL	93	Marty Lyons
DT	96	Curtis McGriff	So
DB	28	Don McNeal	So
DL		Calvin Parker
LB	50	Randy Scott	Fr
DB		Mike Tucker (C)
LB	36	Rich Wingo	Jr

Special teams

Pos.	#	Name	Class
K		Roger Chapman
P	1	Buddy Holt	So
K		Alan McElroy
K		Barry Smith

Head coach

- Bear Bryant

Coordinators/assistant coaches

Legend

- (C) Team captain
- (S) Suspended
- (I) Ineligible
- Injured
- Redshirt
