= 1977 All-SEC football team =

American college football all-star team

The 1977 All-SEC football team consists of American football players selected to the All-Southeastern Conference (SEC) chosen by various selectors for the 1977 NCAA Division I football season.

== Offensive selections ==
=== Receivers ===
- Wes Chandler, Florida (AP-1, UPI)
- Martin Cox, Vanderbilt (AP-1)
- Dave Trosper, Kentucky (AP-2)
- Carlos Carson, LSU (AP-2)

=== Tight ends ===
- Ozzie Newsome, Alabama (AP-1, UPI)
- Curtis Weathers, Ole Miss (AP-2)

=== Tackles ===
- Robert Dugas, LSU (AP-1, UPI)
- Jim Bunch, Alabama (AP-1, UPI)
- Mark Trogdon, Miss St.(AP-2)
- Brent Watson, Tennessee (AP-2)

=== Guards ===
- Thom Dornbrook, Kentucky (AP-1)
- Lynn Johnson, Auburn (AP-1)
- Randy White Ole Miss (AP-2)
- George Collins, Georgia (UPI)

=== Centers ===
- Robert Shaw, Tennessee (AP-2, UPI)
- Dwight Stephenson, Alabama (AP-1)

=== Quarterbacks ===
- Derrick Ramsey, Kentucky (AP-1, UPI)
- Jeff Rutledge, Alabama (AP-2)

=== Halfbacks ===
- Charles Alexander, LSU (College Football Hall of Fame) (AP-1, UPI)
- Tony Green, Florida (AP-2, UPI)
- Tony Nathan, Alabama (AP-2)

=== Fullbacks ===
- Johnny Davis, Alabama (AP-1, UPI)

== Defensive selections ==
=== Ends ===
- Art Still, Kentucky (AP-1, UPI)
- George Plasketes, Ole Miss (AP-1, UPI)
- Wayne Hamilton, Alabama (AP-2)
- John Adams, LSU (AP-2)

=== Tackles ===
- Larry Gillard, Miss. St. (AP-1, UPI)
- Ronnie Swoopes, Georgia (AP-1)
- Dennis Harrison, Vanderbilt (UPI)
- Marty Lyons, Alabama (AP-2)
- Jerry Blanton, Kentucky (AP-2)

=== Middle guards ===
- Scott Hutchinson, Florida (AP-1, UPI)
- Richard Jaffe, Kentucky (AP-2)

=== Linebackers ===
- Ben Zambiasi, Georgia (AP-1, UPI)
- Freddie Smith, Auburn (AP-1, UPI)
- Scot Brantley, Florida (AP-1, UPI)
- Ed Smith, Vanderbilt (AP-1)
- Kem Coleman, Ole Miss (AP-2)
- Charlie Williams, Florida (AP-2)
- Barry Krauss, Alabama (AP-2)

=== Backs ===
- Mike Siganos, Kentucky (AP-1, UPI)
- Bill Krug, Georgia (AP-2, UPI)
- Dallas Owens, Kentucky (AP-1)
- James McKinney, Auburn (AP-1)
- Mike Kramer, Alabama (UPI)
- Mike Tucker, Alabama (AP-2)
- Brenard Wilson, Vanderbilt (AP-2)

== Special teams ==
=== Kickers ===
- Jorge Portela, Auburn (AP-1, UPI)
- Berj Yepremian, Florida (AP-1)

=== Punters ===
- Jim Miller, Ole Miss (AP-2, UPI)
- Craig Colquitt, Tennessee (AP-1)

== Key ==
AP = Associated Press

UPI = United Press International

Bold = Consensus first-team selection by both AP and UPI

== See also ==
- 1977 College Football All-America Team
