= 1977 Auburn Tigers football team =

American college football season

1977 Auburn Tigers football
- Conference: Southeastern Conference
- Record: 6–5 (5–1 SEC)
- Head coach: Doug Barfield (2nd season)
- Offensive coordinator: Dal Shealy (1st season)
- Defensive coordinator: P. W. Underwood (2nd season)
- Home stadium: Jordan-Hare Stadium

1977 Southeastern Conference football standings
| | Conf. | | | | | Overall |
| Team | W | | L | | T | W | | L | | T |
|---|---|---|---|---|---|---|---|---|---|---|
| No. 2 Alabama $ | 7 | – | 0 | – | 0 | 11 | – | 1 | – | 0 |
| No. 6 Kentucky | 6 | – | 0 | – | 0 | 10 | – | 1 | – | 0 |
| Auburn | 5 | – | 1 | – | 0 | 6 | – | 5 | – | 0 |
| LSU | 4 | – | 2 | – | 0 | 8 | – | 4 | – | 0 |
| Florida | 3 | – | 3 | – | 0 | 6 | – | 4 | – | 1 |
| Georgia | 2 | – | 4 | – | 0 | 5 | – | 6 | – | 0 |
| Mississippi State | 2 | – | 4 | – | 0 | 5 | – | 6 | – | 0 |
| Ole Miss | 3 | – | 4 | – | 0 | 6 | – | 5 | – | 0 |
| Tennessee | 1 | – | 5 | – | 0 | 4 | – | 7 | – | 0 |
| Vanderbilt | 0 | – | 6 | – | 0 | 2 | – | 9 | – | 0 |
$ – Conference champion; Kentucky ineligible for SEC championship due to NCAA probation. Mississippi State later forfeited all 1977 wins due to NCAA violations.; Rankings from AP Poll

The 1977 Auburn Tigers football team achieved an overall record of 5–6 under second-year head coach Doug Barfield and 4–2 in the SEC. However, due to sanctions imposed against the Mississippi state, the loss that year was forfeited and Auburn's record officially improved to 6–5 (5–1).

Four players were named to the All-SEC first team for 1977: Lynn Johnson (OG), James McKinney (DB), Jorge Portela (SP), and Freddie Smith (LB).

== Schedule ==
| Date | Opponent | Site | TV | Result | Attendance | Source |
|---|---|---|---|---|---|---|
| September 10 | Arizona* | Jordan-Hare Stadium; Auburn, AL | | W 21–10 | 45,000 | |
| September 17 | Southern Miss* | Jordan-Hare Stadium; Auburn, AL | | L 13–24 | 42,000 | |
| September 24 | at Tennessee | Neyland Stadium; Knoxville, TN (rivalry) | | W 14–12 | 84,084 | |
| October 1 | Ole Miss | Jordan-Hare Stadium; Auburn, AL (rivalry) | ABC | W 21–15 | 48,000 | |
| October 8 | NC State* | Jordan-Hare Stadium; Auburn, AL | | L 15–17 | 45,000 | |
| October 15 | at Georgia Tech* | Grant Field; Atlanta, GA (rivalry) | | L 21–38 | 54,961 | |
| October 22 | at Florida State* | Doak Campbell Stadium; Tallahassee, FL | | L 3–24 | 42,464 | |
| October 29 | No. 18 Florida | Jordan-Hare Stadium; Auburn, AL (rivalry) | | W 29–14 | 57,000 | |
| November 5 | Mississippi State^{†} | Jordan-Hare Stadium; Auburn, AL | | W 13–27 (forfeit win) | 58,000 | |
| November 12 | at Georgia | Sanford Stadium; Athens, GA (rivalry) | | W 33–14 | 57,500 | |
| November 26 | vs. No. 2 Alabama | Legion Field; Birmingham, AL (Iron Bowl) | | L 21–48 | 69,921 | |
*Non-conference game; ^{†}Homecoming; Rankings from AP Poll released prior to the game

== Personnel ==
1977 Auburn Tigers football team roster
Players
Coaches
Offense

| Pos. | # | Name | Class |
|---|---|---|---|
| RB | 32 | William Andrews | Jr |
| RB | | James Brooks |
| WR | 45 | Rusty Byrd | So |
| RB | 20 | Joe Cribbs | So |
| WR | | Byron Franklin |
| OL | | Lynn Johnson |
| TE | 80 | Reese McCall | Sr |
| QB | 6 | Charlie Trotman | So |

Defense

| Pos. | # | Name | Class |
|---|---|---|---|
| DB | | James McKinney |

Special teams

| Pos. | # | Name | Class |
|---|---|---|---|
| P | | Skip Johnston |
| K | 3 | Jorge Portela | So |

Head coach

- Doug Barfield

Coordinators/assistant coaches

Legend

- (C) Team captain
- (S) Suspended
- (I) Ineligible
- Injured
- Redshirt
