= Dennis Harrison =

American football player (born 1956)

No. 68, 96
- Position: Defensive end

Personal information
- Born: July 31, 1956 (age 70); Cleveland, Ohio, U.S.
- Listed height: 6 ft 8 in (2.03 m)
- Listed weight: 275 lb (125 kg)

Career information
- High school: Riverdale (Murfreesboro, Tennessee)
- College: Vanderbilt
- NFL draft: 1978: 4th round, 92nd overall pick

Career history
- Philadelphia Eagles (1978–1984); Los Angeles Rams (1985); San Francisco 49ers (1986); Atlanta Falcons (1986–1987)

Awards and highlights
- Pro Bowl (1982); First-team All-SEC (1977)

Career NFL statistics
- Sacks: 61
- Fumble recoveries: 7
- Interceptions: 1
- Stats at Pro Football Reference

Dennis Harrison Jr. (born July 31, 1956) is an American former professional football player who was a defensive end for 10 seasons in the National Football League (NFL). He played in Super Bowl XV for the Philadelphia Eagles and was selected to the Pro Bowl after the 1982 season. In 1983, he led the Philadelphia Eagles in sacks with 11.5 on the season.

== Early life ==
Harrison was born on July 31, 1956, in Cleveland, Ohio. He attended Riverdale High School in Murfreesboro, Tennessee where he was a standout on the school's football and wrestling teams. As a senior, he was the state's heavyweight wrestling champion, going 25–0 on the season, with 20 pins. He played tight end, defensive end and defensive tackle on Riverdale's football team. He participated in the 1974 Tennessee Secondary School Athletic Association (TSSAA) All-Star game at defensive tackle, and was named Most Valuable Lineman in that game. He was also on the track team, throwing the shot put and discus. As a high school senior, he was 6 ft 4 in (1.93 m) 240 lb (108.9 kg) or 247 lb (112 kg).

== College career ==
Harrison received a football scholarship to attend Vanderbilt University. He played on the Vanderbilt Commodores varsity team from his freshman year (1974) on. His first defensive coach at Vanderbilt was future Hall of Fame coach Bill Parcells. As a freshman, he was named the defensive player of the game in the 1974 Peach Bowl against Texas Tech. In that game, a 6–6 tie, he blocked a field goal attempt in the fourth quarter. At defensive tackle, he was a key player during a goal line stand that stopped Texas Tech from scoring a touchdown on three consecutive running plays within Vanderbilt's five-yard line. He was selected All-SEC (Southeastern Conference) in 1977 by United Press International. He was selected to play in the Blue-Gray Classic and the Hula Bowl.

== Professional career ==
The Philadelphia Eagles selected Harrison in the fourth round of the 1978 NFL draft (92nd overall). He was drafted by future Hall of Fame head coach Dick Vermeil, and played under Vermeil from 1978 to 1982. He played defensive end for the Philadelphia Eagles from 1978 to 1984, being selected to play in the Pro Bowl in 1982. He became a full time starter at left defensive end in 1980, and started 68 games there for the Eagles from 1980 to 1984. His peak seasons came from 1982 to 1984, when he had 10.5, 11.5 and 12 quarterback sacks, respectively. His 11.5 sacks in 1983 led the Eagles defense. He went to Super Bowl XV under Vermeil in the 1980 season, losing to the Oakland Raiders, 27–10. Harrison was defensive team captain in 1984.

Harrison held out before the 1985 season for a salary increase, reportedly because he was making less than half in salary as the team's other defensive end, Greg Brown. He was traded to the Los Angeles Rams for two draft picks, having become expendable after the Eagles signed future Hall of Fame defensive end Reggie White. He played in 12 games for the Rams in 1985, but did not start any games.

The San Francisco 49ers signed Harrison in July 1986. The 49ers waived Harrison in October 1986, and he was acquired by the Atlanta Falcons. He did not start any games for either team that season. In 1987, his final season, Harrison started four games for the Falcons at right defensive end, with 1.5 sacks.

Over a 10-year NFL career, Harrison started 79 regular season games, with 61 quarterback sacks, seven fumble recoveries and one interception.

== Honors ==
He was named to the Vanderbilt Athletics Hall of Fame Class of 2023. In 1999, he was inducted into the Tennessee Sports Hall of Fame.

== Coaching career ==
Harrison was the first black assistant football coach at Franklin Road Academy (FRA). He coached at FRA for seven years, and in 1991 FRA's football team was the TSSAA champion. He also coached at Page High School for three years, where his wrestling team finished second in Tennessee in 1996 and he was named Class A/AA Coach of the Year. He left in 1997 for a coaching position at Vanderbilt University. From 1997 to 2001, he was an assistant coach to head football coach Woody Widenhofer at Vanderbilt, coaching the defensive line. Harrison is currently a coach and gym teacher for middle school football, track, and girls basketball at Brentwood Middle School in Brentwood, Tennessee.

== Personal life ==
At Vanderbilt, he attended the George Peabody College for Teachers, and became a teacher and coach after his football career, at Brentwood Middle School, among others. He has also served as a social minister at Greater St. John Missionary Baptist.

Harrison and his wife Ida, a nurse, have 12 children. His son David Harrison was a two-time Mr. Basketball in Tennessee and was named to the 2001 McDonald's All-American game before a standout career at the University of Colorado - Boulder. The 7 ft (2.13 m) tall David was drafted in the first round of the 2004 NBA draft by the Indiana Pacers, and played in four seasons for the Pacers as well as professionally in China. His daughter, Isabelle, played basketball at Tennessee and was selected as the 12th pick in 2015 WNBA draft by the Phoenix Mercury. She has played eight WNBA seasons, while missing three other seasons due to injury or illness.

In 1999, Harrison was charged with assaulting his wife, Ida, though she said she did not believe Harrison intended her any harm in the incident that led to the charges. The matter was resolved in June 2000, when Harrison was placed in a pretrial diversion program, that included a 24-week domestic violence counseling program with other family members. The couple have remained together.
