= Martin Cox =

American gridiron football player (born 1956)

Profile
- Position: Wide receiver

Personal information
- Born: August 12, 1956 (age 70); Mullins, South Carolina, U.S.

Career information
- College: Vanderbilt
- NFL draft: 1979: 10th round, 270th overall pick

Career history
- 1979–1981: Ottawa Rough Riders
- 1981–1982: Toronto Argonauts
- 1982: Winnipeg Blue Bombers
- 1983: Tampa Bay Bandits

Awards and highlights
- CFL East All-Star (1979); Frank M. Gibson Trophy (1979); First-team All-SEC (1977); Second-team All-SEC (1978)

Martin Cox (born August 12, 1956) is a former Canadian Football League (CFL) wide receiver.

Cox played his college football at Vanderbilt University. In his first CFL season, with the Ottawa Rough Riders, he caught 32 passes for 546 yards and seven touchdowns, winning him the Frank M. Gibson Trophy as top rookie in the CFL East. He later played with the Toronto Argonauts and Winnipeg Blue Bombers.

Cox finished his career in 1983 in the United States Football League (USFL) with the Tampa Bay Bandits.
