= 1977 Mississippi State Bulldogs football team =

American college football season

1977 Mississippi State Bulldogs football
- Conference: Southeastern Conference
- Record: 5–6, 5 wins forfeited (2–4 SEC, 2 wins forfeited)
- Head coach: Bob Tyler (5th season)
- Home stadium: Scott Field; Mississippi Veterans Memorial Stadium

1977 Southeastern Conference football standings
	Conf.					Overall
Team	W		L		T	W		L		T
No. 2 Alabama $	7	–	0	–	0	11	–	1	–	0
No. 6 Kentucky	6	–	0	–	0	10	–	1	–	0
Auburn	5	–	1	–	0	6	–	5	–	0
LSU	4	–	2	–	0	8	–	4	–	0
Florida	3	–	3	–	0	6	–	4	–	1
Georgia	2	–	4	–	0	5	–	6	–	0
Mississippi State	2	–	4	–	0	5	–	6	–	0
Ole Miss	3	–	4	–	0	6	–	5	–	0
Tennessee	1	–	5	–	0	4	–	7	–	0
Vanderbilt	0	–	6	–	0	2	–	9	–	0
$ – Conference champion; Kentucky ineligible for SEC championship due to NCAA probation. Mississippi State later forfeited all 1977 wins due to NCAA violations.; Rankings from AP Poll

The 1977 Mississippi State Bulldogs football team represented Mississippi State University during the 1977 NCAA Division I football season. The Bulldogs finished 5–6 on the field, but were later forced to forfeit the wins due to having played an ineligible player.

== Schedule ==
Date	Opponent	Rank	Site	Result	Attendance	Source
September 3	North Texas State*	No. 16	Scott Field; Starkville, MS	F 17–15 (forfeit)	31,000	
September 10	at Washington*	No. 16	Husky Stadium; Seattle, WA	F 27–18 (forfeit)	45,050	
September 24	No. 13 Florida	No. 12	Mississippi Veterans Memorial Stadium; Jackson, MS	L 22–24	36,000	
October 1	at Kansas State*	No. 18	KSU Stadium; Manhattan, KS	F 24–21 (forfeit)	30,060	
October 8	at No. 16 Kentucky		Commonwealth Stadium; Lexington, KY	L 7–23	57,914	
October 15	at Memphis State*		Liberty Bowl Memorial Stadium; Memphis, TN	L 13–21	48,432	
October 22	Southern Miss*		Scott Field; Starkville, MS	L 7–14	36,000	
October 29	No. 2 Alabama		Mississippi Veterans Memorial Stadium; Jackson, MS (rivalry)	L 7–37	47,500	
November 5	at Auburn		Jordan-Hare Stadium; Auburn, AL	F 27–13 (forfeit)	58,000	
November 12	at LSU		Tiger Stadium; Baton Rouge, LA (rivalry)	L 24–27	61,333	
November 19	vs. Ole Miss		Mississippi Veterans Memorial Stadium; Jackson, MS (Egg Bowl)	F 18–14 (forfeit)	46,500	
*Non-conference game; Rankings from AP Poll released prior to the game

== Personnel ==
1977 Mississippi State Bulldogs football team roster
Players			Coaches
Offense: Pos. / # / Name / Class; QB / / Bruce Threadgill / Sr	Defense: Pos. / # / Name / Class	Special teams: Pos. / # / Name / Class	Head coach: Bob Tyler; Coordinators/assistant coaches Legend: (C) Team captain; (S) Suspended; (I) Ineligible; Injured; Redshirt
