= 1977 Ole Miss Rebels football team =

American college football season

1977 Ole Miss Rebels football
- Conference: Southeastern Conference
- Record: 6–5 (3–4 SEC)
- Head coach: Ken Cooper (4th season)
- Home stadium: Hemingway Stadium; Mississippi Veterans Memorial Stadium

1977 Southeastern Conference football standings
	Conf.					Overall
Team	W		L		T	W		L		T
No. 2 Alabama $	7	–	0	–	0	11	–	1	–	0
No. 6 Kentucky	6	–	0	–	0	10	–	1	–	0
Auburn	5	–	1	–	0	6	–	5	–	0
LSU	4	–	2	–	0	8	–	4	–	0
Florida	3	–	3	–	0	6	–	4	–	1
Georgia	2	–	4	–	0	5	–	6	–	0
Mississippi State	2	–	4	–	0	5	–	6	–	0
Ole Miss	3	–	4	–	0	6	–	5	–	0
Tennessee	1	–	5	–	0	4	–	7	–	0
Vanderbilt	0	–	6	–	0	2	–	9	–	0
$ – Conference champion; Kentucky ineligible for SEC championship due to NCAA probation. Mississippi State later forfeited all 1977 wins due to NCAA violations.; Rankings from AP Poll

The 1977 Ole Miss Rebels football team represented the University of Mississippi (Ole Miss) in the 1977 NCAA Division I football season as a member of the Southeastern Conference (SEC). The team was led by head coach Ken Cooper, in his fourth and final season, and played their home games at Hemingway Stadium in Oxford, the Mississippi Memorial Stadium in Jackson, Mississippi and Liberty Bowl Memorial Stadium in Memphis, Tennessee. They finished the season with a record of five wins and six losses (5–6 overall, 2–5 in the SEC). In 1978 their record was updated to six wins and five losses (6–5 overall, 3–4 in the SEC) after Mississippi State was forced by the NCAA to forfeit their win over the Rebels for playing an ineligible player.

== Schedule ==
Date	Opponent	Site	TV	Result	Attendance	Source
September 3	Memphis State*	Mississippi Veterans Memorial Stadium; Jackson, MS (rivalry)		W 7–3	45,500	
September 10	at No. 6 Alabama	Legion Field; Birmingham, AL (rivalry)		L 13–34	74,324	
September 17	No. 3 Notre Dame*	Mississippi Veterans Memorial Stadium; Jackson, MS		W 20–13	48,200	
September 24	Southern Miss*	Hemingway Stadium; Oxford, MS		L 19–27	20,000	
October 1	at Auburn	Jordan-Hare Stadium; Auburn, AL (rivalry)	ABC	L 15–21	48,000	
October 8	at Georgia	Sanford Stadium; Athens, GA		L 13–14	56,200	
October 15	South Carolina*	Hemingway Stadium; Oxford, MS		W 17–10	30,100	
October 22	Vanderbilt	Hemingway Stadium; Oxford, MS (rivalry)		W 26–14	32,300	
October 29	LSU	Mississippi Veterans Memorial Stadium; Jackson, MS (rivalry)	ABC	L 21–28	46,000	
November 12	vs. Tennessee	Liberty Bowl Memorial Stadium; Memphis, TN (rivalry)		W 43–14	50,259	
November 19	vs. Mississippi State	Mississippi Veterans Memorial Stadium; Jackson, MS (Egg Bowl)		W 14–18 (forfeit)	46,500	
*Non-conference game; Rankings from AP Poll released prior to the game

== Game summaries ==
=== Notre Dame ===
Notre Dame Fighting Irish (1–0) at Ole Miss Rebels

Quarter	1	2	3	4	Total
Notre Dame	0	7	0	6	13
Ole Miss	3	7	0	10	20

at Mississippi Veterans Memorial Stadium, Jackson, Mississippi

- Date: September 17, 1977
- Game weather: Sunny, 90 °F (32 °C)
- Game attendance: 48,200
- Recap

Game information

First quarter

- MISS – Carl Langley 29-yard field goal. Ole Miss 3–0. Drive: 64 yards.

Second quarter

- ND – Jerome Heavens 2-yard run (Dave Reeve kick). Notre Dame 7–3. Drive: 8 plays.
- MISS – James Storey 10-yard pass from Bobby Garner (Carl Langley kick). Ole Miss 10–7. Drive: 6 plays, 75 yards.

Fourth quarter

- ND – Dave Reeve 44-yard field goal. Tie 10–10. Drive: 5 plays
- ND – Dave Reeve 28-yard field goal, 4:53. Notre Dame 13–10. Drive:
- MISS – James Storey 10-yard pass from Tim Ellis (Carl Langley kick), 3:13. Ole Miss 17–13. Drive: 5 plays, 80 yards.
- MISS – Carl Langley 27-yard field goal, 1:44. Ole Miss 20–13. Drive:

Top passers

- ND – Rusty Lisch – 11/25, 127 yards, 2 INT

Top rushers

- ND – Jerome Heavens – 16 rushes, 70 yards, TD

Top receivers

- ND – Ken MacAfee – 6 receptions, 69 yards

Ole Miss gave eventual national champion Notre Dame its only loss of the season.

== Roster ==
1977 Ole Miss Rebels football team roster
Players
Coaches
Offense

Pos.	#	Name	Class
QB		David Coates
WR		Roy Coleman
OL		Chuck Commiskey
TE		Bill Denny
QB		Tim Ellis	Sr
WR		Willie Foster
QB		Bobby Garner
RB		Roger Gordon
OL		Jimmy Hawkins
WR		Les Kimbrough
QB		Jim Lear
RB	20	Leon Perry	So
RB		Jarratt Price
RB		Tyrone Richards
RB		L.Q. Smith
FB		James Storey
OL		Mickey Thames
OL		Terrance Walker
TE		Curtis Weathers
OL		Randy White
RB		Freddie Lee Williams

Defense

Pos.	#	Name	Class
DL		Charlie Cage
LB		Eddie Cole
LB		Kem Coleman
DB		William Day
DB		Al Dotson
DB		John Fabris
DL		Bob Grefseng
DL		Lawrence Johnson
DB		Gary Jones
		Brian Moreland
DL		Bryan Niebhur
DL		George Plasketes

Special teams

Pos.	#	Name	Class
K		Carl Langley
K		Robin Lavinghouze
P		Jim Miller

Head coach

- Ken Cooper

Coordinators/assistant coaches

- Keith Daniels
  (Running backs coach)

Legend

- (C) Team captain
- (S) Suspended
- (I) Ineligible
- Injured
- Redshirt
