= Johnny Davis (American football) =

American football player (born 1956)

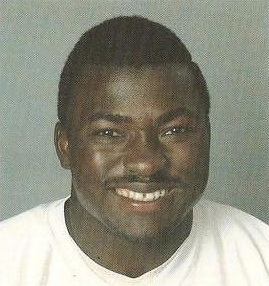
- Davis in 1985

No. 38
- Position: Fullback

Personal information
- Born: July 17, 1956 (age 70); Montgomery, Alabama, U.S.
- Listed height: 6 ft 1 in (1.85 m)
- Listed weight: 235 lb (107 kg)

Career information
- High school: Sidney Lanier (Montgomery)
- College: Alabama (1974–1977)
- NFL draft: 1978: 2nd round, 30th overall pick

Career history
- Tampa Bay Buccaneers (1978–1980); San Francisco 49ers (1981); Cleveland Browns (1982–1987)

Awards and highlights
- Super Bowl champion (XVI); Second-team All-American (1977); First-team All-SEC (1977); 2× Second-team All-SEC (1975, 1976)

Career NFL statistics
- Rushing yards: 1,094
- Rush attempts: 314
- Rushing touchdowns: 15
- Games played: 119
- Stats at Pro Football Reference

Johnny Lee Davis (born July 17, 1956) is an American former professional football player who was a running back for 10 seasons in the National Football League (NFL) from 1978 to 1987. Davis was a member of the 1981 San Francisco 49ers team that won Super Bowl XVI. He is a graduate of Sidney Lanier High School in Montgomery, Alabama, and the University of Alabama in Tuscaloosa.

== Early life ==
Davis was a team captain as a senior at Sidney Lanier High School in Montgomery, Alabama. He was a four-year letter winner for coach Bill Joiner as a running back and linebacker. He also made the Coach and Athlete magazine High School All-America Team in 1973, the Birmingham News First-team All-State 1973, All-Class 4A 1973, All-City 1973, and was named Mr. Back in Montgomery. He rushed for 1,152 yards on 250 carries with six touchdowns as a senior. In the AHSAA North-South All-Star Game in 1974, he was named the Most Valuable Back. He also earned five letters in track, competing in discus and shot put.

== College career (1974–1978) ==
Davis played for the University of Alabama under coach Paul W. "Bear" Bryant and is one of the legendary "wishbone fullbacks". He lettered three of the four years of his college career. On November 23, 1977, Coach Bryant called him "the best fullback I've ever coached" in The Tuscaloosa News. Nicknamed "Bull", Davis led the Crimson Tide in rushing in three of his four seasons at Alabama, and he ranked third all-time at Alabama with 2,519 career rushing yards on 447 attempts, 5.64 average yards per carry, and 21 touchdowns. He was a member of the 2nd Team All-SEC 1975, 2nd Team All-SEC 1976, 2nd Team UPI All-America Team 1977, 1st Team All-SEC 1977, and Alabama Team of the Decade 1970s. He was also named to the 1977 Churchmen Hall of Fame All-America Team, which honors players for on-field performance and church work off the field. Davis was ABC-TV and Chevrolet Most Outstanding Offensive Player of the Game vs. Auburn in 1975 when he rushed for 98 yards on 18 carries, the Dixie Howell Memorial Award Winner at the 1975 Spring A-Day Game, and ABC-TV and Chevrolet Most Outstanding Offensive Player of the Game vs. LSU in 1977 when he rushed for 126 yards on 23 carries. He competed in the Orange Bowl, Liberty Bowl, and two Sugar Bowls. As a senior, Davis was the top rusher in inaugural match-up vs. Ohio State, with 95 yards on 24 rushing attempts while leading the Crimson Tide to a 38–6 win over the Buckeyes in the 1978 Sugar Bowl. He was invited to the 1978 Senior Bowl and named the South's Most Outstanding Offensive Player, leading the South with 109 rushing yards on 23 carries and scoring a touchdown. While at Alabama, Davis and Ozzie Newsome were roommates throughout their college careers and remain best friends to this day. Davis is a member of Omega Psi Phi Fraternity.

=== Alabama school records ===
Among Alabama school records, Davis ranks ninth in career rushing with 2,519 yards, and is the only fullback in the top ten of all-time rushers, ranking fourth with a career average of 5.64 yards per carry, for those with a minimum of 400 attempts. Davis ranks third all-time with a 6.67 yards per carry single-season average, for those with a minimum of 100 attempts, achieved in the 1975 season. He led his team in rushing three consecutive years (1975–1977) and is tied for seventh with seven career 100-yard rushing performances. He holds the record for most 100-yard rushing performances by a fullback with seven. He achieved the longest run from scrimmage in the 1975 season (66-yard TD vs. TCU) and in the 1976 season (58-yard TD vs. LSU). He also achieved the most rushing yards in a single game in the 1975 season (155 yards vs. Washington) and the 1977 season (153 yards vs. Vanderbilt).

== Professional career ==
Davis was selected in the second round of the 1978 NFL draft, 30th overall, by The Tampa Bay Buccaneers. As a blocking fullback for the Tampa Bay Buccaneers, Davis opened holes for tailback Ricky Bell's best rushing season in 1979, helping his team win the NFC Central Division. He played in the 1980 NFC Championship Game with the Tampa Bay Buccaneers.

In 1981, Davis played for the San Francisco 49ers, where he won a Super Bowl XVI ring. Nicknamed "Goal Line", he averaged a touchdown every 13 times he carried the ball for the 49ers. Davis was the first African-American player from the University of Alabama to win a Super Bowl, winning Super Bowl XVI in 1981 with the San Francisco 49ers. He was their third leading scorer and third best rusher, scoring a season total of 42 points on 7 TDs. He played in all 19 games; five as the starter, and rushed twice for five yards in the Super Bowl. He scored a TD in the 1982 NFC Championship Game, in which the 49ers defeated the Dallas Cowboys.

In 1982, he signed with the Cleveland Browns and played alongside his college roommate and best friend Ozzie Newsome. While with the Browns, he was nicknamed the "B1 Bomber". He received the "Captain's Award" in 1984, an honor voted by his teammates as the individual representing the essence of being a Cleveland Browns player. He played in the 1986 AFC Championship Game with the Cleveland Browns. He earned two game balls for special teams play with the Cleveland Browns. He was described in the Cleveland Browns media guide by those who knew him as "unselfish, hard-working and always smiling. B-1 is a powerful blocker and an excellent kickoff coverage man." He retired from the NFL in 1988 after ten years. He was a tough inside runner and considered one of the best blocking fullbacks in NFL history. He played in 119 regular season games, started 32, and had 1,200 yards from scrimmage, 15 rushing touchdowns, 1,094 rushing yards on 314 rushing attempts for 3.5 average yards per carry, along with 22 receptions and 106 receiving yards in his career.

== See also ==
- Alabama Crimson Tide football yearly statistical leaders
