= 1977 Georgia Bulldogs football team =

American college football season

1977 Georgia Bulldogs football
- Conference: Southeastern Conference
- Record: 5–6 (2–4 SEC)
- Head coach: Vince Dooley (14th season)
- Defensive coordinator: Erk Russell (14th season)
- Base defense: 4–4
- Home stadium: Sanford Stadium

1977 Southeastern Conference football standings
	Conf.					Overall
Team	W		L		T	W		L		T
No. 2 Alabama $	7	–	0	–	0	11	–	1	–	0
No. 6 Kentucky	6	–	0	–	0	10	–	1	–	0
Auburn	5	–	1	–	0	6	–	5	–	0
LSU	4	–	2	–	0	8	–	4	–	0
Florida	3	–	3	–	0	6	–	4	–	1
Georgia	2	–	4	–	0	5	–	6	–	0
Mississippi State	2	–	4	–	0	5	–	6	–	0
Ole Miss	3	–	4	–	0	6	–	5	–	0
Tennessee	1	–	5	–	0	4	–	7	–	0
Vanderbilt	0	–	6	–	0	2	–	9	–	0
$ – Conference champion; Kentucky ineligible for SEC championship due to NCAA probation. Mississippi State later forfeited all 1977 wins due to NCAA violations.; Rankings from AP Poll

The 1977 Georgia Bulldogs football team represented the University of Georgia as a member of the Southeastern Conference (SEC) during the 1977 NCAA Division I football season. Led by 14th-year head coach Vince Dooley, the Bulldogs compiled an overall record of 5–6, with a mark of 2–4 in conference play, and finished tied for sixth in the SEC.

== Schedule ==
Date	Opponent	Rank	Site	TV	Result	Attendance	Source
September 10	Oregon*	No. 19	Sanford Stadium; Athens, GA		W 27–16	45,000	
September 17	Clemson*	No. 17	Sanford Stadium; Athens, GA (rivalry)		L 6–7	55,100	
September 24	at South Carolina*		Williams–Brice Stadium; Columbia, SC (rivalry)		W 15–13	56,784	
October 1	at No. 10 Alabama		Bryant–Denny Stadium; Tuscaloosa, AL (rivalry)		L 10–18	60,210	
October 8	Ole Miss		Sanford Stadium; Athens, GA		W 14–13	56,200	
October 15	at Vanderbilt		Dudley Field; Nashville, TN (rivalry)		W 24–13	25,700	
October 22	No. 8 Kentucky		Sanford Stadium; Athens, GA		L 0–33	59,100	
October 29	Richmond*^{†}		Sanford Stadium; Athens, GA		W 23–7	48,500	
November 5	vs. Florida		Gator Bowl Stadium; Jacksonville, FL (rivalry)	ABC	L 17–22	68,538	
November 12	Auburn		Sanford Stadium; Athens, GA (rivalry)		L 14–33	57,500	
November 26	Georgia Tech*		Grant Field; Atlanta, GA (rivalry)		L 7–16	60,104	
*Non-conference game; ^{†}Homecoming; Rankings from AP Poll released prior to the game

== Roster ==
1977 Georgia Bulldogs football team roster
Players
Coaches
Offense

Pos.	#	Name	Class
OT	66	George Collins	Sr
RB	36	Willie McClendon	Jr
RB	39	Kevin McLee	Sr
TE	86	Ulysses Norris	Jr
QB	7	Jeff Pyburn	So

Defense

Pos.	#	Name	Class
LB	93	Ray Donaldson	So
LB	44	Ben Zambiasi	Sr

Special teams

Pos.	#	Name	Class
K	5	Rex Robinson	Fr
P	6	Mike Garrett	So

Head coach

- Vince Dooley

Coordinators/assistant coaches

- Erk Russell (DC)

Legend

- (C) Team captain
- (S) Suspended
- (I) Ineligible
- Injured
- Redshirt
