= Brenard Wilson =

American football player (born 1955)

No. 22
- Position: Safety

Personal information
- Born: August 15, 1955 (age 71); Daytona Beach, Florida, U.S.
- Listed height: 6 ft 0 in (1.83 m)
- Listed weight: 187 lb (85 kg)

Career information
- High school: Father Lopez
- College: Vanderbilt
- NFL draft: 1978: undrafted

Career history
- Philadelphia Eagles (1978–1986); Atlanta Falcons (1987)

Awards and highlights
- 2× Second-team All-SEC (1976, 1977)

Career NFL statistics
- Interceptions: 17
- Fumble recoveries: 6
- Stats at Pro Football Reference

Brenard Kenric Wilson (born August 15, 1955), is an American former professional football player who was a safety in the National Football League (NFL) for the Philadelphia Eagles from 1979 to 1987.

== Biography ==
Brenard Wilson attended Vanderbilt University, playing college football for the Vanderbilt Commodores.

In 1979, Wilson was signed by the Philadelphia Eagles as the starting free safety, doing a credible job with 4 interceptions. In 1980 and 1981, he had 6 and 5 interceptions, respectively. With Wilson and Randy Logan as the strong-side safety, the Eagles won the NFC Championship Game of the 1980-81 NFL playoffs against the Dallas Cowboys, but lost Super Bowl XV to the Oakland Raiders. In 1982, he had only 1 interception and was replaced in 1983 by Wes Hopkins, who had greater range in the defensive secondary.

In 1987, he joined the Atlanta Falcons team.
