= 1977 LSU Tigers football team =

American college football season

1977 LSU Tigers football

Sun Bowl, L 14–24 vs. Stanford
- Conference: Southeastern Conference
- Record: 8–4 (4–2 SEC)
- Head coach: Charles McClendon (16th season)
- Captains: Steve Ripple; Kelly Simmons
- Home stadium: Tiger Stadium

1977 Southeastern Conference football standings
| | Conf. | | | | | Overall |
| Team | W | | L | | T | W | | L | | T |
|---|---|---|---|---|---|---|---|---|---|---|
| No. 2 Alabama $ | 7 | – | 0 | – | 0 | 11 | – | 1 | – | 0 |
| No. 6 Kentucky | 6 | – | 0 | – | 0 | 10 | – | 1 | – | 0 |
| Auburn | 5 | – | 1 | – | 0 | 6 | – | 5 | – | 0 |
| LSU | 4 | – | 2 | – | 0 | 8 | – | 4 | – | 0 |
| Florida | 3 | – | 3 | – | 0 | 6 | – | 4 | – | 1 |
| Georgia | 2 | – | 4 | – | 0 | 5 | – | 6 | – | 0 |
| Mississippi State | 2 | – | 4 | – | 0 | 5 | – | 6 | – | 0 |
| Ole Miss | 3 | – | 4 | – | 0 | 6 | – | 5 | – | 0 |
| Tennessee | 1 | – | 5 | – | 0 | 4 | – | 7 | – | 0 |
| Vanderbilt | 0 | – | 6 | – | 0 | 2 | – | 9 | – | 0 |
$ – Conference champion; Kentucky ineligible for SEC championship due to NCAA probation. Mississippi State later forfeited all 1977 wins due to NCAA violations.; Rankings from AP Poll

The 1977 LSU Tigers football team represented Louisiana State University (LSU) as a member of the Southeastern Conference (SEC) during the 1977 NCAA Division I football season. Led by 16th-year head coach Charles McClendon, the Tigers compiled an overall record of 8–4, with a mark of 4–2 in conference play, and finished fourth in the SEC.

== Schedule ==
| Date | Opponent | Rank | Site | TV | Result | Attendance | Source |
|---|---|---|---|---|---|---|---|
| September 17 | at Indiana* | | Memorial Stadium; Bloomington, IN | | L 21–24 | 30,067 | |
| September 24 | Rice* | | Tiger Stadium; Baton Rouge, LA | | W 77–0 | 67,844 | |
| October 1 | No. 9 Florida | | Tiger Stadium; Baton Rouge, LA (rivalry) | | W 36–14 | 68,029 | |
| October 8 | at Vanderbilt | No. 18 | Dudley Field; Nashville, TN | | W 28–15 | 24,000 | |
| October 15 | No. 12 Kentucky^{†} | No. 16 | Tiger Stadium; Baton Rouge, LA | | L 13–33 | 71,495 | |
| October 22 | Oregon* | | Tiger Stadium; Baton Rouge, LA | | W 56–17 | 59,017 | |
| October 29 | Ole Miss | | Mississippi Veterans Memorial Stadium; Jackson, MS (rivalry) | | W 28–21 | 46,000 | |
| November 5 | No. 2 Alabama | No. 18 | Tiger Stadium; Baton Rouge, LA (rivalry) | ABC | L 3–24 | 65,377 | |
| November 12 | Mississippi State | | Tiger Stadium; Baton Rouge, LA (rivalry) | | W 27–24 | 61,333 | |
| November 19 | at Tulane* | | Louisiana Superdome; New Orleans, LA (Battle for the Rag) | | W 20–17 | 72,205 | |
| November 26 | Wyoming* | | Tiger Stadium; Baton Rouge, LA | | W 66–7 | 52,338 | |
| December 31 | vs. Stanford* | | Sun Bowl; El Paso, TX (Sun Bowl) | CBS | L 14–24 | 31,318 | |
*Non-conference game; ^{†}Homecoming; Rankings from AP Poll released prior to the game

== Roster ==
1977 LSU Tigers football team roster
Players
Coaches
Offense

| Pos. | # | Name | Class |
|---|---|---|---|
| RB | 4 | Charles Alexander | Jr |
| WR | 3 | Carlos Carson | So |
| QB | | Steve Ensminger | So |
| QB | | David Woodley |

Defense

| Pos. | # | Name | Class |
|---|---|---|---|
| DB | 37 | Willie Teal | So |

Special teams

| Pos. | # | Name | Class |
|---|---|---|---|
| K | | Mike Conway |

Head coach

- Charles McClendon

Coordinators/assistant coaches

Legend

- (C) Team captain
- (S) Suspended
- (I) Ineligible
- Injured
- Redshirt

Roster
