= Ed Smith (linebacker) =

American football player (born 1957)

No. 52, 54, 56
- Position: Linebacker

Personal information
- Born: May 18, 1957 (age 69); Chattanooga, Tennessee, U.S.
- Listed height: 6 ft 2 in (1.88 m)
- Listed weight: 216 lb (98 kg)

Career information
- High school: The McCallie School (Chattanooga)
- College: Vanderbilt
- NFL draft: 1979: 12th round, 322nd overall pick

Career history
- Pittsburgh Steelers (1979)*; Baltimore Colts (1980–1981); Chicago Blitz (1983); Arizona Wranglers (1984); Oakland Invaders (1985)
- * Offseason or practice squad member only

Awards and highlights
- First-team All-SEC (1977)

Career NFL statistics
- Sacks: 3
- Fumble recoveries: 2
- Interceptions: 2
- Stats at Pro Football Reference

Ed Smith (born May 18, 1957) is an American former professional football player who was a linebacker in the National Football League (NFL) for the Baltimore Colts. He also played in the United States Football League (USFL) for the Arizona Wranglers. He played college football for the Vanderbilt Commodores.
