= Jerry Blanton =

American football player (born 1956)

No. 57
- Position: Linebacker

Personal information
- Born: December 20, 1956 (age 69); Toledo, Ohio, U.S.
- Listed height: 6 ft 1 in (1.85 m)
- Listed weight: 231 lb (105 kg)

Career information
- College: Kentucky
- NFL draft: 1978: 11th round, 282nd overall pick

Career history
- Kansas City Chiefs (1979–1985)

Awards and highlights
- Second-team All-SEC (1977)

Career NFL statistics
- Interceptions: 1
- Sacks: 3.0
- Fumble recoveries: 2
- Stats at Pro Football Reference

Gerald Blanton (born December 20, 1956) is an American former professional football player who was a linebacker for his entire seven-year career with the Kansas City Chiefs of the National Football League (NFL). He played college football for the Kentucky Wildcats.

A native of Toledo, Ohio, Jerry Blanton was a star fullback and linebacker at DeVilbiss High School, which honored him by naming him to the school's Hall of Fame. Blanton joined Fran Curci's Kentucky Wildcats in 1974, and was the first freshman to become a varsity starter at UK. Only 6' - 2", 235 pounds at the peak of his career, small for a defensive lineman in the Southeastern Conference, Blanton compensated for his relative lack of size with intelligence, a big heart, quickness and a refuse-to-lose mentality. In his 4 years at UK, Blanton achieved many individual honors, as well as leading Kentucky's defense to a Peach Bowl win in 1976. He had 387 tackles in four years as a starter, ranking him 7th on UK's all-time list.

An 11th round draft choice of the Buffalo Bills in 1978, and was the last player cut after training camp before joining the Kansas City Chiefs in 1979. After being known as one of the best special teams players in the NFL, Blanton became a starting inside linebacker in 1980. His most productive season as a pro was in 1983, when rolled up a career high 136 tackles to lead the team, notching 45 tackles in a 3-game span ... A career high 17 tackles on Monday Night Football vs. San Diego ... 12 the following Sunday at Washington ... 16 the next Sunday at Miami.

After retiring from the NFL in 1986, Blanton used his degree earned at UK to become a criminal investigator with the Jackson County Prosecuting Attorney's Office, and spent 11 years as an area manager for Anheuser-Busch. Most recently, Jerry served as Deputy Commissioner of Kentucky State Parks, the highest position ever held in the state parks system by an African-American, where he specialized in safety compliance, finance and security.
