= Derrick Ramsey =

American football player and administrator

Kentucky Secretary of Education and Workforce Development
- In office December 8, 2015 – December 10, 2019
- Governor: Matt Bevin
- Succeeded by: Jacqueline Coleman

Kentucky Deputy Secretary of Commerce
- In office 2003–2007
- Governor: Ernie Fletcher

Personal details
- Born: December 23, 1956 (age 69) Hastings, Florida, U.S.
- Education: University of Kentucky
- Known for: Professional athlete
- Football career

No. 84, 88
- Position: Tight end/Quarterback

Career information
- College: Kentucky
- NFL draft: 1978: 5th round, 136th overall pick

Career history
- 1978–1983: Oakland/Los Angeles Raiders
- 1983–1985: New England Patriots
- 1987: Detroit Lions

Awards and highlights
- 2× Super Bowl champion (XV, XVIII); Third-team All-American (1977); First-team All-SEC (1977)
- Stats at Pro Football Reference

Derrick Kent Ramsey (born December 23, 1956) is an American administrator and former professional football player. He played as a tight end for nine seasons in the National Football League (NFL). After his football career, he was Kentucky Secretary of Education and Workforce Development in 2018 and 2019, under Governor Matt Bevin, after serving as secretary of the Labor Cabinet from 2015 to 2018. He served as Deputy Secretary of Commerce under another Republican governor, Ernie Fletcher, from 2003 to 2007. Bevin appointed him to the Board of Trustees of University of Kentucky on July 25, 2017. He served until 2023. He was a senior fellow at The Urban Institute, then a senior fellow at the Kentucky Community and Technical College System, leading projects for the chancellor and president. In January 2024, Ramsey became special assistant to KCTCS President Ryan Quarles for strategic partnerships. Quarles had placed second in the 2023 Republican primary for governor.

He grew up in Hastings, Florida and attended Hastings High School, where he won state football championships in his first two years. He moved to live with an uncle in Camden, New Jersey, and play for the Camden High School football team, which went 2–8 in his junior year and won the New Jersey state championship in his senior year.

Ramsey attended the University of Kentucky, where he played college football for the Kentucky Wildcats as a quarterback and tight end. He was part of the team that won the 1976 SEC championship and the 1976 Peach Bowl. He was first-team All-SEC and third-team All-American as quarterback in 1977, when Kentucky finished with a 10–1 record and No. 6 ranking in the final AP poll. Ramsey also played two games on the Wildcats basketball team as a walk-on in 1976. He played in the NFL for the Oakland/Los Angeles Raiders, New England Patriots, and Detroit Lions.

He has a master's degree in sports administration from Eastern Kentucky University and served as the Athletic Director at Coppin State University from 2008 to 2015.
