= 1977 Florida Gators football team =

American college football season

1977 Florida Gators football
- Conference: Southeastern Conference
- Record: 6–4–1 (3–3 SEC)
- Head coach: Doug Dickey (8th season)
- Offensive scheme: Wishbone
- Defensive coordinator: Doug Knotts (8th season)
- Captains: Wes Chandler; Scott Hutchinson; Charlie Williams
- Home stadium: Florida Field

1977 Southeastern Conference football standings
	Conf.					Overall
Team	W		L		T	W		L		T
No. 2 Alabama $	7	–	0	–	0	11	–	1	–	0
No. 6 Kentucky	6	–	0	–	0	10	–	1	–	0
Auburn	5	–	1	–	0	6	–	5	–	0
LSU	4	–	2	–	0	8	–	4	–	0
Florida	3	–	3	–	0	6	–	4	–	1
Georgia	2	–	4	–	0	5	–	6	–	0
Mississippi State	2	–	4	–	0	5	–	6	–	0
Ole Miss	3	–	4	–	0	6	–	5	–	0
Tennessee	1	–	5	–	0	4	–	7	–	0
Vanderbilt	0	–	6	–	0	2	–	9	–	0
$ – Conference champion; Kentucky ineligible for SEC championship due to NCAA probation. Mississippi State later forfeited all 1977 wins due to NCAA violations.; Rankings from AP Poll

The 1977 Florida Gators football team represented the University of Florida during the 1977 NCAA Division I football season. The season was Doug Dickey's eighth as the head coach of the Florida Gators football team. Dickey's 1977 Florida Gators finished with a 6–4–1 overall record and a 3–3 Southeastern Conference (SEC) record, placing fifth among ten SEC teams.

== Before the season ==
Florida had several quarterbacks, with Terry LeCount starting.

== Schedule ==
Date	Opponent	Rank	Site	TV	Result	Attendance	Source
September 17	at Rice*	No. 19	Rice Stadium; Houston, TX		W 48–3	24,000	
September 24	at No. 12 Mississippi State	No. 13	Mississippi Veterans Memorial Stadium; Jackson, MS	ABC	W 24–22	36,000	
October 1	at LSU	No. 9	Tiger Stadium; Baton Rouge, LA (rivalry)		L 14–36	68,029	
October 8	No. 15 Pittsburgh*	No. 20	Florida Field; Gainesville, FL		T 17–17	62,724	
October 22	Tennessee	No. 19	Florida Field; Gainesville, FL (rivalry)		W 27–17	62,711	
October 29	at Auburn	No. 18	Jordan-Hare Stadium; Auburn, AL (rivalry)		L 14–29	57,000	
November 5	vs. Georgia		Gator Bowl Stadium; Jacksonville, FL (rivalry)	ABC	W 22–17	68,538	
November 12	No. 7 Kentucky		Florida Field; Gainesville, FL (rivalry)		L 7–14	58,125	
November 19	Utah*^{†}		Florida Field; Gainesville, FL		W 38–29	56,055	
November 26	at Miami (FL)*		Miami Orange Bowl; Miami, FL (rivalry)		W 31–14	30,662	
December 3	No. 19 Florida State*		Florida Field; Gainesville, FL (rivalry)	ABC	L 9–37	63,563	
*Non-conference game; ^{†}Homecoming; Rankings from AP Poll released prior to the game

== Game summaries ==
=== Rice ===
Team	1	2	Total
Rice	3	0	3
• Florida	21	27	48

- Date: September 17
- Location: Florida Field

Florida opened the season in Houston with a non-conference game against Rice. Former all-conference safety Terry LeCount started at quarterback in the Gators' wishbone offense, but the most notable play at the position came in the 4th quarter, when third-string freshman Cris Collinsworth tossed an NCAA record 99-yard touchdown pass to Derrick Gaffney on his first collegiate attempt.

=== Mississippi State ===
In the second week of play, Florida edged Mississippi State 24–22.yepremian junior kicker comes through again keeping Florids hopes alive

=== LSU ===
Louisiana State beat Florida 36–14. Wes Chandler had 146 yards receiving, including an 85-yard reception from Terry LeCount.

=== Pittsburgh ===
Team	1	2	3	4	Total
Pittsburgh	0	7	7	3	17
Florida	0	7	0	10	17

- Date: October 8
- Location: Florida Field

Scoring summary
Q2		FLA	Brewton recovered fumble in end zone (Yepremian kick)	FLA 7–0
Q2	4:11	PITT	Cavanaugh 3 yard run (Schubert kick)	Tie 7–7
Q3	3:55	PITT	Taylor 34 yard pass from Heath (Schubert kick)	PITT 14–7
Q4		FLA	Hatch recovered blocked punt in end zone (Yepremian kick)	Tie 14–14
Q4	5:56	PITT	Schubert 27 yard field goal	PITT 17–14
Q4	1:28	FLA	Yepremian 28 yard field goal	Tie 17–17

Florida and Pitt tied 17–17.

=== Tennessee ===
Team	1	2	3	4	Total
Tennessee	0	3	14	0	17
• Florida	7	10	0	10	27

- Date: October 22
- Location: Florida Field
- Game attendance: 62,711

Scoring summary
Q1		FLA	Chandler 1 yard run (Yepremian kick)	FLA 7–0
Q2		TENN	Gaylor 45 yard field goal	FLA 7–3
Q2		FLA	Johnson 10 yard run (Yepremian kick)	FLA 14–3
Q2		FLA	Yepremian 48 yard field goal	FLA 17–3
Q3		TENN	Harper 18 yard pass from Streater (Gaylor kick)	FLA 17–10
Q3		TENN	Finch 99 yard run (Gaylor kick)	Tie 17–17
Q4	1:32	FLA	Yepremian 28 yard field goal	FLA 20–17
Q4	0:02	FLA	Green 6 yard run (Yepremian kick)	FLA 27–17

The Gators called a timeout in the final seconds of a 27–17 win over the Tennessee Volunteers. Tennessee coach Johnny Majors was furious, and the post-game handshake ritual became a shoving match between coaching staffs.

=== Auburn ===
The Auburn Tigers upset Florida 29–14.

=== Georgia ===
Team	1	2	3	4	Total
Georgia	7	10	0	0	17
• Florida	0	10	6	6	22

- Date: November 5
- Location: Gator Bowl, Jacksonville, Florida
- Game attendance: 68,538
- Television network: ABC

Scoring summary
1		UGA	Willie McClendon 2-yard run (Rex Robinson kick)	UGA 7-0
2		FLA	Wes Chandler 12-yard pass from Terry LeCount (Berj Yepremian kick)	Tied 7-7
2	10:41	UGA	Willie McClendon 74-yard run (Rex Robinson kick)	UGA 14-7
2		FLA	Berj Yepremian 33-yard field goal	UGA 14-10
2	0:11	UGA	Rex Robinson 29-yard field goal	UGA 17-10
3	6:15	FLA	Wes Chandler 18-yard run (run failed)	UGA 17-16
4	6:32	FLA	Wes Chandler 1-yard run (run failed)	FLA 22-17

The Gators beat rival Georgia 22–17.

=== Kentucky ===
The seventh-ranked Kentucky Wildcats defeated Florida 14–7.

=== Utah ===
Team	1	2	3	4	Total
Utah	3	14	3	9	29
• Florida	7	3	0	28	38

- Date: November 19
- Location: Florida Field, Gainesville, Florida
- Game attendance: 56,055

Scoring summary
Q1	13:46	FLA	LeCount 74-yard run (Yepremian kick)	FLA 7–0
Q1	:33	UTAH	McNamara 37-yard field goal	FLA 7–3
Q2	9:30	UTAH	Wilson 9-yard pass from Gomez (McNamara kick)	UTAH 10–7
Q2	2:03	UTAH	Gomez 9-yard run (McNamara kick)	UTAH 17–7
Q2	:00	FLA	Yepremian 54-yard field goal	UTAH 17–10
Q3	2:07	UTAH	McNamara 26-yard field goal	UTAH 20–10
Q4	13:47	FLA	Wilder 11-yard run (Yepremian kick)	UTAH 20–17
Q4	12:35	UT	McNamara 27-yard field goal	UTAH 23–17
Q4	9:48	FLA	Chandler 31-yard run (Yepremian kick)	FLA 24–23
Q4	4:07	FLA	Gaffney 11-yard pass from Brantley (Yepremian kick)	FLA 31–23
Q4	2:24	UTAH	Parker 9-yard pass from Gomez (pass failed)	FLA 31–29
Q4	1:43	FLA	Chandler 34-yard run (Yepremian kick)	FLA 38–29

The Gators ran over the Utah Utes for 531 yards and won 38–29.

=== Miami (FL) ===
Team	1	2	3	4	Total
• Florida	3	7	7	14	31
Miami (FL)	0	7	0	7	14

- Date: November 26
- Location: Orange Bowl, Miami

Scoring summary
1	FLA	Yepremian 50-yard field goal	FLA 3-0
2	MIA	Hobbs 11-yard run (Dennis kick)	MIA 7-3
2	FLA	Stephens 16-yard pass from LeCount (Yepremian kick)	FLA 10-7
3	FLA	Green 8-yard run (Yepremian kick)	FLA 17-7
4	FLA	Dupree 64-yard blocked field goal return (Yepremian kick)	FLA 24-7
4	FLA	Carr 2-yard run (Yepremian kick)	FLA 31-7
4	MIA	Alves 17-yard pass from Myers (Dennis kick)	FLA 31-14

Florida defeated the Miami Hurricanes 31–14.

=== Florida State ===
Team	1	2	3	4	Total
• FSU	10	7	7	13	37
Florida	3	6	0	0	9

- Date: December 3
- Location: Florida Field, Gainesville, Florida
- Game attendance: 63,563

Scoring summary
1	FSU	Unglaub 38-yard pass from Woodham (? kick)	FSU 7-0
1	FSU	? 5-yard field goal	FSU 10-0
1	FLA	Yepremian 15-yard field goal	FSU 10-3
2	FSU	Overby 4-yard pass from Jordan	FSU 17-3
2	FLA	Yepremian ? yard field goal	FSU 17-6
2	FLA	Yepremian ? yard field goal	FSU 17-9
3	FSU	Overby 30-yard pass from Jordan	FSU 24-9
4	FSU	?	FSU 31-9
4	FSU	?	FSU 37-9

Bobby Bowden got his first win over the Gators, as Florida State beat Florida 37–9.

== Roster ==
1977 Florida Gators football team roster
Players
Coaches
Offense

Pos.	#	Name	Class
QB		John Brantley
RB	30	Earl Carr	Sr
WR	89	Wes Chandler	Sr
TE		Juan Collins
QB	21	Cris Collinsworth	Fr
TE	40	Lewis Gilbert	Sr
RB	33	Tony Green	Sr
WR	23	Derrick Gaffney	Sr
OT	67	Ed Jacobsen	Sr
QB	7	Terry LeCount	Sr
RB		Willie Wilder

Defense

Pos.	#	Name	Class
LB		Scot Brantley
DE		Richard Brewton
DE		Mike DuPree
DB	25	Chuck Hatch	Jr
DT	66	Scott Hutchinson	Sr

Special teams

Pos.	#	Name	Class
PK		Berj Yepremian	Jr

Head coach

- Doug Dickey

Coordinators/assistant coaches

Legend

- (C) Team captain
- (S) Suspended
- (I) Ineligible
- Injured
- Redshirt

== Awards ==
Four Gators made All-SEC.
