= List of Pittsburgh Panthers in the NFL draft =

This is a list of Pittsburgh Panthers football players in the NFL draft.

== Key ==
B	Back	K	Kicker	NT	Nose tackle
C	Center	LB	Linebacker	FB	Fullback
DB	Defensive back	P	Punter	HB	Halfback
DE	Defensive end	QB	Quarterback	WR	Wide receiver
DT	Defensive tackle	RB	Running back	G	Guard
E	End	T	Offensive tackle	TE	Tight end

== Selections ==
Year	Round	Pick	Player	Team	Position
1937	2	19	Ave Daniell	Green Bay Packers	T
1937	3	30	Bobby Larue	Los Angeles Rams	B
1937	4	37	Bill Glassford	Detroit Lions	G
1938	3	20	Frank Patrick	Chicago Cardinals	B
1938	4	29	Tony Matisi	Pittsburgh Steelers	T
1938	6	48	Frank Souchak	New York Giants	E
1938	12	102	John Michelosen	Philadelphia Eagles	B
1939	2	12	Marshall Goldberg	Chicago Cardinals	B
1939	3	25	John Chickerneo	New York Giants	B
1939	4	27	Hal Stebbins	Chicago Cardinals	B
1939	5	31	Bill Daddio	Chicago Cardinals	E
1939	8	66	Bob Dannies	Chicago Bears	C
1939	9	72	Steve Petro	Pittsburgh Steelers	G
1939	13	112	Fabian Hoffman	Pittsburgh Steelers	E
1939	16	141	Al Lezouski	Pittsburgh Steelers	G
1940	6	49	Dick Cassiano	Green Bay Packers	B
1940	8	61	Ben Kish	Chicago Cardinals	B
1941	8	63	George Kracum	Chicago Cardinals	B
1942	14	127	Stan Gervelis	Brooklyn Dodgers	E
1942	19	180	Edgar Jones	Chicago Bears	B
1943	3	25	Bill Dutton	Washington Redskins	B
1943	26	245	Jack Stetler	Cleveland Rams	B
1943	29	277	Jack Durishan	Pittsburgh Steelers	T
1943	30	283	George Allshouse	Brooklyn Dodgers	C
1945	11	109	Ralph Hammond	Green Bay Packers	C
1945	14	139	Frank Mattioli	Chicago Bears	G
1945	17	165	John Itzel	Pittsburgh Steelers	B
1945	25	254	Angelo Carlaccini	Pittsburgh Steelers	B
1945	32	328	Loren Braner	Philadelphia Eagles	C
1946	22	203	George Johnson	Pittsburgh Steelers	T
1946	31	292	John Itzel	Philadelphia Eagles	B
1948	16	142	Bill McPeak	Pittsburgh Steelers	E
1948	32	299	Tony DeMattea	Pittsburgh Steelers	B
1949	17	171	Leo Skladany	Philadelphia Eagles	E
1950	3	39	Jimmy Joe Robinson	Cleveland Browns	B
1950	11	143	Bob Plotz	Cleveland Browns	G
1950	13	167	Lou Cecconi	San Francisco 49ers	B
1950	16	204	Bernie Barkouskie	Pittsburgh Steelers	G
1950	29	372	Carl DePasqua	Pittsburgh Steelers	B
1951	16	189	Ted Geremsky	Detroit Lions	E
1951	30	354	Nick Bolkovac	Washington Redskins	T
1952	24	282	Bob Bestwick	Pittsburgh Steelers	B
1952	29	342	Chris Warriner	Pittsburgh Steelers	E
1953	2	23	Billy Reynolds	Cleveland Browns	B
1953	7	85	Joe Schmidt	Detroit Lions	LB
1954	9	103	Joe Zombek	Pittsburgh Steelers	E
1954	11	127	Lou Cimarolli	Pittsburgh Steelers	B
1954	14	161	Bobby Epps	New York Giants	B
1954	29	346	Dick Dietrick	Los Angeles Rams	E
1955	5	58	Eldred Kraemer	San Francisco 49ers	T
1955	9	109	Henry Ford	Cleveland Browns	B
1955	10	121	Glen Dillon	Cleveland Browns	E
1955	12	141	Lou Palatella	San Francisco 49ers	T
1955	22	258	Richie McCabe	Pittsburgh Steelers	B
1955	27	320	Paul Blanda	New York Giants	B
1956	2	24	John Paluck	Washington Redskins	E
1956	17	196	Bill Schmidt	Pittsburgh Steelers	G
1956	20	231	Fred Glatz	Pittsburgh Steelers	E
1956	22	255	Ray DiPasquale	Pittsburgh Steelers	B
1956	23	268	Pete Neft	Pittsburgh Steelers	QB
1956	25	300	Glen Tunning	Los Angeles Rams	G
1957	2	21	Joe Walton	Washington Redskins	E
1957	4	45	Vince Scorsone	Washington Redskins	G
1957	9	104	Charlie Brueckman	San Francisco 49ers	C
1957	10	113	Ralph Jelic	Pittsburgh Steelers	B
1957	15	174	Herman Canil	Pittsburgh Steelers	T
1957	17	198	Dan Wisniewski	Baltimore Colts	G
1957	17	199	Corny Salvaterra	Pittsburgh Steelers	QB
1957	23	271	Bob Pollock	Pittsburgh Steelers	T
1958	2	14	Jim McCusker	Chicago Cardinals	T
1958	4	41	John Guzik	Los Angeles Rams	G
1958	9	105	Ron Kissell	New York Giants	T
1958	30	355	Dick Scherer	Pittsburgh Steelers	E
1959	9	100	Dick Haley	Washington Redskins	B
1959	15	178	Tom Salwocki	Cleveland Browns	C
1959	22	257	Art Gob	Washington Redskins	E
1959	24	280	Fred Riddle	Detroit Lions	B
1959	29	337	Jack Flara	Green Bay Packers	B
1961	1	5	Mike Ditka	Chicago Bears	TE
1961	3	34	Dick Mills	Detroit Lions	T
1961	3	39	Jim Cunningham	Washington Redskins	B
1961	5	57	Ed Sharockman	Minnesota Vikings	RB
1961	8	110	Fred Cox	Cleveland Browns	RB
1961	10	133	Bob Clemens	Baltimore Colts	B
1961	13	178	Paul Hodge	Detroit Lions	LB
1961	17	231	Steve Jastrzembski	Baltimore Colts	B
1962	10	132	Larry Vignali	Pittsburgh Steelers	G
1962	10	134	Regis Coustillac	San Francisco 49ers	G
1962	19	257	John Kuprok	Pittsburgh Steelers	E
1963	5	59	Gary Kaltenbach	Minnesota Vikings	T
1963	5	69	Lou Slaby	New York Giants	B
1963	6	72	Ernie Bonghetti	Cleveland Browns	T
1963	9	120	John Maczuzak	San Francisco 49ers	T
1963	12	166	Ed Adamchik	New York Giants	G
1963	20	276	James Traficant	Pittsburgh Steelers	B
1964	1	10	Paul Martha	Pittsburgh Steelers	WR
1964	8	100	Ray Popp	New York Giants	G
1964	10	130	Rick Leeson	Washington Redskins	B
1964	16	213	Paul Cercel	Dallas Cowboys	C
1964	20	275	Bryan Generalovich	Pittsburgh Steelers	E
1965	4	49	Marty Schottenheimer	Baltimore Colts	LB
1965	8	102	Bill Howley	Pittsburgh Steelers	E
1966	6	93	Fred Hoaglin	Cleveland Browns	C
1966	9	128	Dale Stewart	Pittsburgh Steelers	DE
1966	11	170	Eric Crabtree	Baltimore Colts	WR
1966	14	203	Joe Novogratz	Pittsburgh Steelers	LB
1966	17	251	Mitch Zalnasky	Washington Redskins	WR
1966	18	263	Ken Lucas	Pittsburgh Steelers	QB
1967	2	51	Jim Flanigan	Green Bay Packers	LB
1968	5	133	Bob Longo	Houston Oilers	WR
1968	13	341	Tom Mitrakos	San Francisco 49ers	C
1969	5	122	Harry Orszulak	San Diego Chargers	WR
1970	9	229	Goeff Brown	Cleveland Browns	LB
1970	12	312	Rodney Fedorchak	Kansas City Chiefs	G
1971	3	62	Charles Hall	Green Bay Packers	DB
1971	5	115	Bryant Salter	San Diego Chargers	QB
1971	7	176	Dennis Ferris	Chicago Bears	RB
1971	9	227	Dave Garnett	Oakland Raiders	RB
1971	12	302	Tony Esposito	Kansas City Chiefs	RB
1971	12	308	Bill Pilconis	Detroit Lions	WR
1972	3	60	Bob Kuziel	New Orleans Saints	C
1972	5	119	Ralph Cindrich	Atlanta Falcons	LB
1972	11	277	Joe Carroll	Oakland Raiders	LB
1972	15	375	Joel Klime	New England Patriots	TE
1972	16	394	Henry Alford	St. Louis Cardinals	DE
1973	12	311	Ernie Webster	Washington Redskins	G
1973	13	331	John Moss	Detroit Lions	LB
1974	11	278	Rod Kirby	Buffalo Bills	LB
1974	12	295	Jim Buckmon	New Orleans Saints	DE
1974	15	376	Dave Wannstedt	Green Bay Packers	T
1975	3	55	Gary Burley	Cincinnati Bengals	DE
1975	17	424	Mike Bulino	Kansas City Chiefs	DB
1976	4	101	Tom Perko	Green Bay Packers	LB
1976	7	193	Karl Farmer	Atlanta Falcons	WR
1976	17	474	Randy Cozens	Denver Broncos	DE
1977	1	2	Tony Dorsett	Dallas Cowboys	RB
1977	7	185	Larry Swider	Denver Broncos	P
1977	7	194	Jim Corbett	Cincinnati Bengals	TE
1977	11	289	Al Romano	Houston Oilers	LB
1977	11	302	Carson Long	Los Angeles Rams	K
1977	12	314	Don Parrish	St. Louis Cardinals	DE
1978	1	21	Randy Holloway	Minnesota Vikings	DE
1978	2	50	Matt Cavanaugh	New England Patriots	QB
1978	3	63	Bob Jury	Seattle Seahawks	DB
1978	6	148	Elliott Walker	San Francisco 49ers	RB
1978	6	160	Randy Reutershan	Pittsburgh Steelers	WR
1978	8	210	J. C. Wilson	Houston Oilers	DB
1978	9	223	Willie Taylor	Tampa Bay Buccaneers	WR
1978	11	300	Tom Brzoza	Pittsburgh Steelers	C
1979	2	34	Gordon Jones	Tampa Bay Buccaneers	WR
1979	5	131	Walt Brown	Detroit Lions	C
1979	7	190	Jeff Delaney	Los Angeles Rams	DB
1979	11	296	Al Chesley	Philadelphia Eagles	LB
1979	12	307	Dave Logan	Tampa Bay Buccaneers	DT
1980	6	141	Jo Jo Heath	Cincinnati Bengals	DB
1980	10	276	Bob Gruber	Los Angeles Rams	T
1981	1	7	Hugh Green	Tampa Bay Buccaneers	LB
1981	1	12	Randy McMillan	Baltimore Colts	RB
1981	1	20	Mark May	Washington Redskins	T
1981	2	51	Rickey Jackson	New Orleans Saints	LB
1981	3	63	Greg Meisner	Los Angeles Rams	DT
1981	3	65	Carlton Williamson	San Francisco 49ers	DB
1981	3	69	Russ Grimm	Washington Redskins	C
1981	5	115	Bill Neill	New York Giants	DT
1981	5	120	Benjie Pryor	Cincinnati Bengals	TE
1981	5	121	Lynn Thomas	San Francisco 49ers	DB
1981	5	128	Jerry Boyarsky	New Orleans Saints	DT
1981	11	292	Rick Trocano	Pittsburgh Steelers	QB
1982	7	182	Emil Boures	Pittsburgh Steelers	C
1982	10	267	Sal Sunseri	Pittsburgh Steelers	LB
1982	11	284	Sam Clancy	Seattle Seahawks	DE
1983	1	6	Jimbo Covert	Chicago Bears	T
1983	1	11	Tim Lewis	Green Bay Packers	DB
1983	1	27	Dan Marino	Miami Dolphins	QB
1983	5	132	Bryan Thomas	Green Bay Packers	RB
1983	6	149	Dave Puzzuoli	Cleveland Browns	DT
1983	6	160	Ron Sams	Green Bay Packers	G
1983	8	201	Rich Kraynak	Philadelphia Eagles	LB
1983	9	230	Rob Fada	Chicago Bears	G
1983	12	320	Julius Dawkins	Buffalo Bills	WR
1984	1	5	Bill Maas	Kansas City Chiefs	DT
1984	2	37	Jim Sweeney	New York Jets	C
1984	3	84	Joe McCall	Los Angeles Raiders	RB
1984	5	126	Tom Flynn	Green Bay Packers	DB
1984	6	154	Dwight Collins	Minnesota Vikings	WR
1984	10	258	Al Wenglikowski	Kansas City Chiefs	LB
1985	1	2	Bill Fralic	Atlanta Falcons	T
1985	1	4	Chris Doleman	Minnesota Vikings	DE
1985	5	120	Troy Benson	New York Jets	LB
1985	8	218	Marlon McIntyre	Los Angeles Rams	RB
1985	12	319	Bill Wallace	New York Jets	WR
1986	1	24	Bob Buczkowski	Los Angeles Raiders	DE
1986	4	94	Bill Callahan	Pittsburgh Steelers	DB
1987	1	18	Tony Woods	Seattle Seahawks	LB
1987	4	86	Randy Dixon	Indianapolis Colts	T
1987	4	89	Lorenzo Freeman	Green Bay Packers	DT
1987	7	182	Tom Brown	Miami Dolphins	RB
1988	1	24	Craig Heyward	New Orleans Saints	RB
1988	2	48	Quintin Jones	Houston Oilers	DB
1988	5	118	Jon Carter	New York Giants	DE
1988	5	123	Ezekial Gadson	Buffalo Bills	DB
1988	7	173	Gary Richard	Green Bay Packers	DB
1988	10	263	Billy Owens	Dallas Cowboys	DB
1988	11	285	Eddie Miller	San Diego Chargers	C
1989	1	8	Burt Grossman	San Diego Chargers	DE
1989	1	24	Tom Ricketts	Pittsburgh Steelers	T
1989	3	57	Mark Stepnoski	Dallas Cowboys	C
1989	9	242	Vernon Kirk	Los Angeles Rams	TE
1989	10	256	Cornell Holloway	Cincinnati Bengals	DB
1989	10	258	Jerry Olsavsky	Pittsburgh Steelers	LB
1990	3	62	Marc Spindler	Detroit Lions	DT
1990	4	92	Dean Caliguire	San Francisco 49ers	C
1990	4	104	Alonzo Hampton	Minnesota Vikings	DB
1990	6	152	Tom Sims	Kansas City Chiefs	DT
1990	9	227	Chris Goetz	San Diego Chargers	G
1990	11	290	Carnel Smith	Indianapolis Colts	DE
1990	11	298	Roman Matusz	Chicago Bears	T
1991	4	94	Mark Gunn	New York Jets	DT
1991	4	97	Curvin Richards	Dallas Cowboys	RB
1991	9	248	Louis Riddick	San Francisco 49ers	DB
1991	10	252	Brian Greenfield	Cleveland Browns	P
1992	1	3	Sean Gilbert	Los Angeles Rams	DT
1992	2	30	Steve Israel	Los Angeles Rams	DB
1992	4	88	Ricardo McDonald	Cincinnati Bengals	LB
1992	4	91	Jeff Christy	Phoenix Cardinals	T
1992	4	99	Keith Hamilton	New York Giants	DE
1992	7	191	Dave Moore	Miami Dolphins	TE
1993	8	216	Alex Van Pelt	Pittsburgh Steelers	QB
1995	1	14	Ruben Brown	Buffalo Bills	G
1995	3	74	Curtis Martin	New England Patriots	RB
1995	6	207	Tom Barndt	Kansas City Chiefs	C
1996	6	176	Dietrich Jells	Kansas City Chiefs	WR
1996	6	177	Anthony Dorsett	Houston Oilers	DB
1996	6	178	Tom Tumulty	Cincinnati Bengals	LB
2000	3	77	Hank Poteat	Pittsburgh Steelers	DB
2001	3	80	Kevan Barlow	San Francisco 49ers	RB
2002	2	63	Antonio Bryant	Dallas Cowboys	WR
2002	5	153	Ramon Walker	Houston Texans	DB
2002	5	165	Bryan Knight	Chicago Bears	LB
2003	3	70	Gerald Hayes	Arizona Cardinals	LB
2003	6	205	Torrie Cox	Tampa Bay Buccaneers	DB
2003	7	261	Bryan Anderson	Chicago Bears	G
2004	1	3	Larry Fitzgerald	Arizona Cardinals	WR
2004	2	58	Shawntae Spencer	San Francisco 49ers	DB
2004	2	61	Kris Wilson	Kansas City Chiefs	TE
2004	5	147	Claude Harriott	Chicago Bears	DE
2004	6	188	Andy Lee	San Francisco 49ers	P
2004	7	247	Brandon Miree	Denver Broncos	RB
2005	6	209	Rob Petitti	Dallas Cowboys	T
2006	3	65	Charles Spencer	Houston Texans	T
2006	6	174	Josh Lay	New Orleans Saints	DB
2007	1	14	Darrelle Revis	New York Jets	DB
2007	4	136	Clint Session	Indianapolis Colts	LB
2007	6	179	H. B. Blades	Washington Redskins	LB
2008	1	19	Jeff Otah	Carolina Panthers	T
2008	4	109	Mike McGlynn	Philadelphia Eagles	G
2008	7	251	Kennard Cox	Buffalo Bills	DB
2009	2	53	LeSean McCoy	Philadelphia Eagles	RB
2009	5	146	Scott McKillop	San Francisco 49ers	LB
2009	7	240	LaRod Stephens-Howling	Arizona Cardinals	RB
2009	7	251	Derek Kinder	Chicago Bears	WR
2010	6	182	Nate Byham	San Francisco 49ers	TE
2010	7	227	Dorin Dickerson	Houston Texans	TE
2011	1	26	Jon Baldwin	Kansas City Chiefs	WR
2011	2	37	Jabaal Sheard	Cleveland Browns	DE
2011	5	149	Dion Lewis	Philadelphia Eagles	RB
2011	5	150	Jason Pinkston	Cleveland Browns	T
2011	7	226	Greg Romeus	New Orleans Saints	DE
2014	1	13	Aaron Donald	St. Louis Rams	DT
2014	4	135	Tom Savage	Houston Texans	QB
2014	5	146	Devin Street	Dallas Cowboys	WR
2015	4	110	T. J. Clemmings	Minnesota Vikings	T
2016	2	55	Tyler Boyd	Cincinnati Bengals	WR
2017	3	105	James Conner	Pittsburgh Steelers	RB
2017	4	115	Dorian Johnson	Arizona Cardinals	G
2017	5	171	Nathan Peterman	Buffalo Bills	QB
2017	6	200	Adam Bisnowaty	New York Giants	T
2017	7	234	Ejuan Price	Los Angeles Rams	LB
2018	2	62	Brian O'Neill	Minnesota Vikings	T
2018	4	117	Jordan Whitehead	Tampa Bay Buccaneers	DB
2018	4	125	Avonte Maddox	Philadelphia Eagles	DB
2019	5	152	Qadree Ollison	Atlanta Falcons	RB
2020	7	239	Dane Jackson	Buffalo Bills	DB
2021	3	90	Patrick Jones II	Minnesota Vikings	DE
2021	4	135	Rashad Weaver	Tennessee Titans	LB
2021	5	175	Jason Pinnock	New York Jets	DB
2021	6	199	Jaylen Twyman	Minnesota Vikings	DT
2021	6	212	Damar Hamlin	Buffalo Bills	DB
2021	7	230	Jimmy Morrissey	Las Vegas Raiders	C
2022	1	20	Kenny Pickett	Pittsburgh Steelers	QB
2022	4	115	Damarri Mathis	Denver Broncos	DB
2023	1	19	Calijah Kancey	Tampa Bay Buccaneers	DE
2023	4	120	Carter Warren	New York Jets	T
2023	5	143	Israel Abanikanda	New York Jets	RB
2023	5	153	SirVocea Dennis	Tampa Bay Buccaneers	LB
2023	6	208	Erick Hallett	Jacksonville Jaguars	DB
2023	7	248	Brandon Hill	Houston Texans	DB
2024	3	79	Matt Goncalves	Indianapolis Colts	T
2024	5	170	Bub Means	New Orleans Saints	WR
2024	7	229	M. J. Devonshire	Las Vegas Raiders	DB
2025	6	199	Branson Taylor	Los Angeles Chargers	T
2025	6	202	Gavin Bartholomew	Minnesota Vikings	TE
2025	7	242	Konata Mumpfield	Los Angeles Rams	WR
2026	4	138	Kyle Louis	Miami Dolphins	LB

== Notable undrafted players ==
Note: No drafts held before 1936

Debut year	Player name	Position	Debut NFL/AFL team	Notes
1943	Bob Thurbon	RB	Phil-Pitt Steagles	Played 20 games for the Steagles and Card-Pitt between the 1943 and 1944 NFL seasons, and 2 games for the Buffalo Bisons during the 1946 AAFC season
1955	John Reger	LB	Pittsburgh Steelers	Played 144 games for the Steelers and Washington Redskins between the 1955 and 1966 NFL seasons
1965	Fred Mazurek	WR	Washington Redskins	Played 13 games for the Redskins between the 1965 and 1966 NFL seasons
1973	Ron Holliday	WR	San Diego Chargers	Played 11 games for the Chargers during the 1973 NFL season
1976	Glenn Hyde	T	Denver Broncos	Played 115 games for the Broncos, Baltimore Colts, Seattle Seahawks, and Kansas City Chiefs between the 1976 and 1987 NFL seasons
1977	Cecil Johnson	LB	Tampa Bay Buccaneers	Played 111 games for the Buccaneers between the 1977 and 1985 NFL seasons
1981	David Trout	K	Pittsburgh Steelers	Played 19 games for the Steelers during the 1981 and 1987 NFL seasons
1985	Greg Christy	T	Buffalo Bills	Played 7 games for the Bills during the 1985 NFL season
1986	Tony Brown	T	New England Patriots	Played 2 games for the Buffalo Bills during the 1987 NFL season
1987	Steve Apke	LB	Pittsburgh Steelers	Played 3 games for the Steelers during the 1987 NFL season
1990	Tony Siragusa	DT	Indianapolis Colts	Played 169 games for the Colts and Baltimore Ravens between the 1990 and 2001 NFL seasons
1992	Don Silvestri	K	Seattle Seahawks	Played 28 games for the New York Jets between the 1995 and 1996 NFL seasons
1993	Vernon Lewis	DB	New England Patriots	Played 44 games for the Patriots between the 1993 and 1996 NFL seasons
1995	Billy Davis	WR	Dallas Cowboys	Played 93 games for the Cowboys and Baltimore Ravens between the 1995 and 2000 NFL seasons
1999	Matt Lytle	QB	Carolina Panthers	Played 5 games for the Panthers and Seattle Seahawks between the 2000 and 2001 NFL seasons
2000	Darnell Dinkins	TE	New York Giants	Played 89 games for the Giants, Baltimore Ravens, Cleveland Browns, and New Orleans Saints between the 2002 and 2009 NFL seasons
2001	Nick Goings	RB	Carolina Panthers	Played 105 games for the Panthers between the 2001 and 2008 NFL seasons
2004	Lousaka Polite	FB	Dallas Cowboys	Played 82 games for the Cowboys, Chicago Bears, Miami Dolphins, New England Patriots, and Atlanta Falcons between the 2004 and 2012 NFL seasons
2007	Tyler Palko	QB	New Orleans Saints	Played 8 games for the Kansas City Chiefs between the 2010 and 2011 NFL seasons
2009	C. J. Davis	G	Carolina Panthers	Played 14 games for the Panthers and Denver Broncos between the 2010 and 2012 NFL seasons
2011	Henry Hynoski	FB	New York Giants	Played 46 games for the Giants between the 2011 and 2014 NFL seasons
2012	Lucas Nix	G	Oakland Raiders	Played 15 games for the Raiders between the 2012 and 2013 NFL seasons
2014	K'Waun Williams	DB	Cleveland Browns	Played 105 games for the Browns, San Francisco 49ers, and Denver Broncos between the 2014 and 2022 NFL seasons
2016	Nicholas Grigsby	LB	Los Angeles Rams	Played 23 games for the Rams, New England Patriots, and Detroit Lions between the 2016 and 2018 NFL seasons
2016	J. P. Holtz	TE	Cleveland Browns	Played 51 games for the Washington Redskins, Chicago Bears, and New Orleans Saints between the 2019 and 2023 NFL seasons
2016	Lafayette Pitts	DB	Miami Dolphins	Played 40 games for the Dolphins, Jacksonville Jaguars, and Buffalo Bills between the 2016 and 2018 NFL seasons
2017	Ryan Lewis	DB	Arizona Cardinals	Played 25 games for the Buffalo Bills, Indianapolis Colts, Philadelphia Eagles, Miami Dolphins and New York Giants between the 2018 and 2020 NFL seasons
2021	D. J. Turner	WR	Las Vegas Raiders	Played 32 games for the Raiders between the 2022 and 2025 NFL seasons
2022	Cal Adomitis	LS	Cincinnati Bengals	Played 61 games for the Bengals, Philadelphia Eagles, and New Orleans Saints between the 2022 and 2026 NFL seasons
2022	Lucas Krull	TE	New Orleans Saints	Played 24 games for the Saints and Denver Broncos between the 2022 and 2025 NFL seasons
2023	Jared Wayne	WR	Houston Texans	Played 10 games for the Texans and Miami Dolphins between the 2024 and 2026 NFL seasons
2025	Donovan McMillon	DB	Cleveland Browns	Played 24 games for the Browns between the 2025 and 2026 NFL seasons
2025	Ben Sauls	K	Pittsburgh Steelers	Played 3 games for the New York Giants during the 2025 NFL season

== See also ==
- List of University of Pittsburgh faculty
- List of University of Pittsburgh alumni
