= 1977 Pittsburgh Panthers football team =

American college football season

1977 Pittsburgh Panthers football

Gator Bowl champion

Gator Bowl, W 34–3 vs. Clemson
- Conference: Independent

Ranking
- Coaches: No. 7
- AP: No. 8
- Record: 9–2–1
- Head coach: Jackie Sherrill (1st season)
- Offensive coordinator: Bob Leahy (1st season)
- Offensive scheme: Pro I, split backs
- Defensive coordinator: Jimmy Johnson (1st season)
- Base defense: 5–2
- Home stadium: Pitt Stadium

1977 NCAA Division I independents football records
	Conf.					Overall
Team	W		L		T	W		L		T
No. 1 Notre Dame		–		–		11	–	1	–	0
No. 5 Penn State		–		–		11	–	1	–	0
Colgate		–		–		10	–	1	–	0
North Texas State *		–		–		10	–	1	–	0
No. 16 San Diego State		–		–		10	–	1	–	0
Tennessee State		–		–		8	–	1	–	1
No. 14 Florida State		–		–		10	–	2	–	0
No. 8 Pittsburgh		–		–		9	–	2	–	1
East Carolina		–		–		8	–	3	–	0
Rutgers		–		–		8	–	3	–	0
Army		–		–		7	–	4	–	0
Louisville		–		–		7	–	4	–	1
Boston College		–		–		6	–	5	–	0
Cincinnati		–		–		5	–	4	–	2
Georgia Tech		–		–		6	–	5	–	0
Memphis State		–		–		6	–	5	–	0
Northwestern State		–		–		6	–	5	–	0
Syracuse		–		–		6	–	5	–	0
William & Mary		–		–		6	–	5	–	0
Southern Miss		–		–		6	–	5	–	0
Temple		–		–		5	–	5	–	1
Hawaii		–		–		5	–	6	–	0
Navy		–		–		5	–	6	–	0
West Virginia		–		–		5	–	6	–	0
South Carolina		–		–		5	–	7	–	0
Utah State		–		–		4	–	7	–	0
Villanova		–		–		4	–	7	–	0
Illinois State		–		–		3	–	7	–	1
Virginia Tech		–		–		3	–	7	–	1
Miami (FL)		–		–		3	–	8	–	0
Richmond		–		–		3	–	8	–	0
Tulane		–		–		3	–	8	–	0
Air Force		–		–		2	–	8	–	1
Holy Cross		–		–		2	–	8	–	0
Northeast Louisiana		–		–		2	–	9	–	0
North Texas State (originally 9–2) awarded a forfeit win after Mississippi State was found to be using an ineligible player.; Rankings from AP Poll

The 1977 Pittsburgh Panthers football team represented the University of Pittsburgh as an independent during the 1977 NCAA Division I football season. The Panthers competed in the Gator Bowl.

== Schedule ==
Date	Time	Opponent	Rank	Site	TV	Result	Attendance	Source
September 10	4:20 p.m.	No. 3 Notre Dame	No. 7	Pitt Stadium; Pittsburgh, PA (rivalry)	ABC	L 9–19	56,500	
September 17	1:30 p.m.	William & Mary	No. 16	Pitt Stadium; Pittsburgh, PA		W 28–6	39,646	
September 24	1:00 p.m.	at Temple		Veterans Stadium; Philadelphia, PA		W 76–0	13,199	
October 1	1:30 p.m.	at Boston College	No. 16	Alumni Stadium; Chestnut Hill, MA		W 45–7	24,881	
October 8	7:00 p.m.	at No. 20 Florida	No. 15	Florida Field; Gainesville, FL		T 17–17	62,724	
October 15	1:30 p.m.	Navy^{†}	No. 17	Pitt Stadium; Pittsburgh, PA		W 34–17	45,397	
October 22	1:30 p.m.	Syracuse	No. 14	Pitt Stadium; Pittsburgh, PA (rivalry)		W 28–21	43,551	
October 29	1:30 p.m.	Tulane	No. 13	Pitt Stadium; Pittsburgh, PA		W 48–0	46,273	
November 5	1:30 p.m.	at West Virginia	No. 12	Mountaineer Field; Morgantown, WV (Backyard Brawl)		W 44–3	37,031	
November 12	1:30 p.m.	vs. Army	No. 10	Giants Stadium; East Rutherford, NJ		W 52–26	35,387	
November 26	1:30 p.m.	No. 9 Penn State	No. 10	Pitt Stadium; Pittsburgh, PA (rivalry)	ABC	L 13–15	56,500	
December 30	9:00 p.m.	vs. No. 11 Clemson	No. 10	Gator Bowl Stadium; Jacksonville, FL (Gator Bowl)	ABC	W 34–3	72,289	
^{†}Homecoming; Rankings from AP Poll released prior to the game; All times are in Eastern time

== Personnel ==
1977 Pittsburgh Panthers football team roster
Players
Coaches
Offense

Pos.	#	Name	Class
QB		Wayne Adams	Sr
C	67	Tom Brzoza	Sr
QB	12	Matt Cavanaugh	Sr
RB		Jo Jo Heath	So
WR	24	Gordon Jones	Jr
RB		Ray Jones
WR	19	Randy Reutershan	Sr
WR		Willie Taylor
QB		Rick Trocano	Fr
FB	34	Elliott Walker	Sr

Defense

Pos.	#	Name	Class
DB		Mike Balzer
LB	55	Al Chesley	Jr
DT	75	Ed Gallagher	Jr
DL	99	Hugh Green	Fr
DE	70	Randy Holloway	Sr
CB	31	Bob Jury	Sr
DT	78	David Logan	Jr
DT	76	Bill Neill	So

Special teams

Pos.	#	Name	Class
P		Joe Gasparovic
K		Mark Schubert

Head coach

- Jackie Sherrill

Coordinators/assistant coaches

- Larry Bielat (AdmA)
- Don Boyce (OL)
- Foge Fazio (LB)
- Larry Holton (DB)
- Jimmy Johnson (Ast HC/DC)
- Bob Leahy (OC)
- Bob Matey (DL)
- Joe Moore (RB)
- Otto Stowe (WR)
- Dave Wannstedt (Str & Cond)

Legend

- (C) Team captain
- (S) Suspended
- (I) Ineligible
- Injured
- Redshirt

== Season summary ==
=== Notre Dame ===
Notre Dame Fighting Irish (0–0) at Pittsburgh Panthers (0–0)

Quarter	1	2	3	4	Total
Notre Dame	0	6	0	13	19
Pittsburgh	7	2	0	0	9

at Pitt Stadium, Pittsburgh, Pennsylvania

- Date: September 10, 1977
- Game attendance: 56,500
- TV: ABC
- Recap

Game information

First quarter

- PITT – Gordon Jones 12-yard pass from Matt Cavanaugh (Mark Schubert kick). Pitt 7–0. Drive:

Second quarter

- PITT – Safety, Joe Restic tackled in end zone. Pitt 9–0.
- ND – Ken MacAfee 5-yard pass from Rusty Lisch (kick blocked). Pitt 9–6. Drive:

Fourth quarter

- ND – Dave Reeve 35-yard field goal. Tie 9–9. Drive:
- ND – Dave Reeve 26-yard field goal. Notre Dame 12–9. Drive:
- ND - Terry Eurick 4-yard run (Dave Reeve kick). Notre Dame 19–9. Drive:

Top rushers

- ND – Jerome Heavens – 88 yards

== Team players drafted into the NFL ==
Player	Position	Round	Pick	NFL club
Randy Holloway	Defensive end	1	21	Minnesota Vikings
Matt Cavanaugh	Quarterback	2	50	New England Patriots
Bob Jury	Defensive back	3	63	Seattle Seahawks
Elliott Walker	Running back	6	148	San Francisco 49ers
Randy Reutershan	Wide receiver	6	160	Pittsburgh Steelers
J.C. Wilson	Defensive back	8	210	Houston Oilers
Willie Taylor	Wide receiver	9	223	Tampa Bay Buccaneers
Tom Brzoza	Center	11	300	Pittsburgh Steelers
