= 1977 All-America college football team =

Official list of the best college football players of 1977

The 1977 All-America college football team is composed of college football players who were selected as All-Americans by various organizations and writers that chose College Football All-America Teams in 1977. The National Collegiate Athletic Association (NCAA) recognizes four selectors as "official" for the 1977 season. They are: (1) the American Football Coaches Association (AFCA); (2) the Associated Press (AP) selected based on the votes of sports writers at AP newspapers; (3) the Football Writers Association of America (FWAA) selected by the nation's football writers; and (4) the United Press International (UPI) selected based on the votes of sports writers at UPI newspapers. Other selectors included Football News (FN), the Newspaper Enterprise Association (NEA), The Sporting News (TSN), and the Walter Camp Football Foundation (WC).

Eight players were unanimously selected by all four official selectors and all four unofficial selectors. They were Ken MacAfee of Notre Dame, offensive tackle Chris Ward of Ohio State, offensive guard Mark Donahue of Michigan, running backs Earl Campbell of Texas and Terry Miller of Oklahoma State, defensive ends Art Still of Kentucky and Ross Browner of Notre Dame, defensive tackle Brad Shearer of Texas.

== Consensus All-Americans ==
The following charts identify the NCAA-recognized consensus All-Americans for the year 1977 and displays which first-team designations they received.

=== Offense ===
Name	Position	School	Number	Official	Other
Earl Campbell	Running back	Texas	4/4/8	AFCA, AP, FWAA, UPI	FN, NEA, TSN, WC
Mark Donahue	Offensive guard	Michigan	4/4/8	AFCA, AP, FWAA, UPI	FN, NEA, TSN, WC
Ken MacAfee	Tight end	Notre Dame	4/4/8	AFCA, AP, FWAA, UPI	FN, NEA, TSN, WC
Terry Miller	Running back	Oklahoma State	4/4/8	AFCA, AP, FWAA, UPI	FN, NEA, TSN, WC
Chris Ward	Offensive tackle	Ohio State	4/4/8	AFCA, AP, FWAA, UPI	FN, NEA, TSN, WC
Ozzie Newsome	Receiver	Alabama	3/4/7	AFCA, AP, FWAA	FN, NEA, TSN, WC
Leotis Harris	Offensive guard	Arkansas	3/4/8	AFCA, AP, UPI	NEA, WC
Charles Alexander	Running back	LSU	3/1/4	AFCA, FWAA, UPI	WC
Guy Benjamin	Quarterback	Stanford	2/2/4	FWAA, UPI	FN, NEA
Dan Irons	Offensive tackle	Texas Tech	2/2/4	AFCA, UPI	FN, WC
John Jefferson	Receiver	Arizona State	3/0/3	AFCA, AP, FWAA	--
Tom Brzoza	Center	Pittsburgh	2/1/3	AP, UPI	WC

=== Defense ===
Name	Position	School	Number	Official	Other
Ross Browner	Defensive end	Notre Dame	4/4/8	AFCA, AP, FWAA, UPI	FN, NEA, TSN, WC
Brad Shearer	Defensive tackle	Texas	4/4/8	AFCA, AP, FWAA, UPI	FN, NEA, TSN, WC
Art Still	Defensive end	Kentucky	4/4/8	AFCA, AP, FWAA, UPI	FN, NEA, TSN, WC
Zac Henderson	Defensive back	Oklahoma	4/3/7	AFCA, AP, FWAA, UPI	FN, NEA, WC
Jerry Robinson	Linebacker	UCLA	4/3/7	AFCA, AP, FWAA, UPI	FN, NEA, WC
Randy Holloway	Defensive tackle	Pittsburgh	3/4/7	AFCA, FWAA, UPI	FN, NEA, TSN, WC
Dennis Thurman	Defensive back	USC	4/2/6	AFCA, AP, FWAA, UPI	FN, WC
Luther Bradley	Defensive back	Notre Dame	2/3/5	AFCA, UPI	FN, TSN, WC
Bob Jury	Defensive back	Pittsburgh	2/2/4	AP, FWAA	TSN, WC
Tom Cousineau	Linebacker	Ohio State	2/1/3	FWAA, UPI	WC
Gary Spani	Linebacker	Kansas State	2/1/3	AFCA, UPI	FN
Dee Hardison	Defensive tackle	North Carolina	2/1/3	AP, FWAA	FN

== Offense ==
=== Receivers ===
- Ozzie Newsome, Alabama (AFCA [split end], AP-1, FWAA, UPI-2, FN [end], NEA-1, TSN, WC)
- John Jefferson, Arizona State (AFCA [flanker], AP-1, FWAA, NEA-2)
- Wes Chandler, Florida (AP-2, UPI-1, FN [running back], NEA-1, TSN)
- James Lofton, Stanford (AP-2, NEA-2)
- Gordon Jones, Pittsburgh (AP-3)
- Mike Renfro, TCU (AP-3)

=== Tight ends ===
- Ken MacAfee, Notre Dame (AFCA, AP-1, FWAA, UPI-1, FN [end], NEA-1, TSN, WC)
- Mickey Shuler, Penn State (AP-2, NEA-2)
- Clennie Brundidge, Army (UPI-2)
- Mike Moore, Grambling (AP-3)

=== Tackles ===
- Chris Ward, Ohio State (AFCA, AP-1, FWAA, UPI-1, FN, NEA-1, TSN, WC)
- Dan Irons, Texas Tech (AFCA, UPI-1, FN, WC)
- Keith Dorney Penn State (AP-3, FWAA)
- Gordon King, Stanford (UPI-2, NEA-1, TSN)
- Dennis Baker, Wyoming (AP-1)
- William Fifer, West Texas State (AP-2)
- Mike Kenn, Michigan (AP-2)
- J. T. Taylor, Missouri (AP-3, UPI-2)
- Frank Myers, Texas A&M (NEA-2)
- Jeff Morrow, Minnesota (NEA-2)

=== Guards ===
- Mark Donahue, Michigan (AFCA, AP-1, FWAA, UPI-1, FN, NEA-1, TSN, WC)
- Leotis Harris, Arkansas (AFCA, AP-1, UPI-1, NEA-1, WC)
- Joe Bostic, Clemson (AP-3, FWAA, NEA-2)
- Greg Roberts, Oklahoma (AP-3, FN)
- George Collins, Georgia (TSN)
- Jim Hough, Utah State (AP-2)
- Ernie Hughes, Notre Dame (AP-2, UPI-2)
- Leon White, Colorado (UPI-2)
- Bob Cryder, Alabama (NEA-2)

=== Centers ===
- Tom Brzoza, Pittsburgh (AP-1, UPI-1, WC)
- Walt Downing, Michigan (AFCA, AP-3, FN, NEA-2, TSN)
- Tom Davis, Nebraska (FWAA, UPI-2)
- Blair Bush, Washington (AP-2, NEA-1)

=== Quarterbacks ===
- Guy Benjamin, Stanford (AP-2, FWAA, UPI-1, FN, NEA-1)
- Doug Williams, Grambling State (AP-1, UPI-2, NEA-2, TSN, WC)
- Matt Cavanaugh, Pittsburgh (AFCA)
- Derrick Ramsey, Kentucky (AP-3)

=== Running backs ===
- Earl Campbell, Texas (AFCA, AP-1, FWAA, UPI-1, FN, NEA-1, TSN, WC)
- Terry Miller, Oklahoma State (AFCA, AP-1, FWAA, UPI-1, FN, NEA-1, TSN, WC)
- Charles Alexander, LSU (AFCA, AP-2, FWAA, UPI-1, NEA-2, WC)
- John Pagliaro, Yale (AP-3, WC)
- Jerome Persell, Western Michigan (AP-2)
- I. M. Hipp, Nebraska (UPI-2, NEA-2)
- Johnny Davis, Alabama (UPI-2)
- Ben Cowins, Arkansas (UPI-2)
- Bo Robinson, West Texas State (AP-3)

== Defense ==
=== Defensive ends ===
- Art Still, Kentucky (AFCA, AP-1, FWAA, UPI-1, FN, NEA-1, TSN, WC)
- Ross Browner, Notre Dame (AFCA, AP-1, FWAA, UPI-1, FN, NEA-1, TSN, WC)
- John Anderson, Michigan (UPI-2)
- Kelton Dansler, Ohio State (AP-2)
- Willie Fry, Notre Dame (UPI-2)
- Hugh Green, Pittsburgh (AP-2)
- Al Harris, Arizona State (NEA-2)
- Jerry DeLoach, California (AP-3)
- Chuck Schott, Army (AP-3)

=== Defensive tackles ===
- Brad Shearer, Texas (AFCA, AP-1, FWAA, UPI-1, FN, NEA-1, TSN, WC)
- Randy Holloway, Pittsburgh (AFCA, AP-2, FWAA, UPI-1, FN, NEA-1, TSN, WC)
- Dee Hardison, North Carolina (AP-1, FWAA, UPI-2, FN, NEA-2)
- Mike Bell, Colorado State (AP-2)
- Manu Tuiasosopo, UCLA (UPI-2)
- Mekeli Ieremia, Brigham Young (NEA-2)
- Larry Bethea, Michigan State (AP-3, NEA-2 [DE])
- Jimmy Walker, Arkansas (AP-3)

=== Middle guards ===
- Aaron Brown, Ohio St. (AFCA, UPI-2, WC)
- Reggie Kinlaw, Oklahoma (AP-3, UPI-1)
- Randy Sidler, Penn State (AP-1)
- Don Latimer, Pittsburgh (AP-2)

=== Linebackers ===
- Jerry Robinson, UCLA (AFCA, AP-1, FWAA, UPI-1, FN, NEA-1, WC)
- Tom Cousineau, Ohio State (AP-2, FWAA, UPI-1, NEA-2, WC)
- Gary Spani, Kansas St. (AFCA, AP-3, UPI-1, FN, NEA-2)
- Mike Woods, Cincinnati (AP-1, NEA-1, TSN)
- Lucius Sanford, Georgia Tech (AFCA, AP-2, UPI-2, TSN)
- Clay Matthews, Jr., USC (NEA-1, TSN)
- Daryl Hunt, Oklahoma (AP-3, UPI-2, FN, WC)
- John Anderson, Michigan (FWAA)
- George Cumby, Oklahoma (AP-1)
- Bob Golic, Notre Dame (AP-2, UPI-2)
- Harold Randolph, East Carolina (NEA-2)
- Michael Jackson, Washington (AP-3)

=== Defensive backs ===
- Zac Henderson, Oklahoma (AFCA, AP-1, FWAA, UPI-1, FN, NEA-1, WC)
- Dennis Thurman, USC (AFCA, AP-1, FWAA, UPI-1, FN, NEA-2, WC)
- Luther Bradley, Notre Dame (AFCA, AP-2, UPI-1, FN, NEA-2, TSN, WC)
- Bob Jury, Pittsburgh (AP-1, FWAA, UPI-2, NEA-2, TSN, WC)
- Keith Simpson, Memphis State (NEA-1, TSN)
- Ray Griffin, Ohio State (UPI-2, NEA-1, TSN)
- Ken Greene, Washington State (NEA-1)
- Dwight Hicks, Michigan (AP-2)
- Bill Krug, Georgia (UPI-2)
- Charles Williams, Jackson State (AP-2)
- Eric Felton, Texas Tech (NEA-2)
- Larry Anderson, Louisiana Tech (AP-3)
- Ron Johnson, Eastern Michigan (AP-3)
- John Sturges, Navy (AP-3)

== Special teams ==
=== Kickers ===
- Steve Little, Arkansas (FWAA, UPI-1, NEA-1, TSN)
- Tony Franklin, Texas A&M (NEA-2)

=== Punters ===
- Russell Erxleben, Texas (FWAA, UPI-2, NEA-1, TSN)
- Johnny Evans, NC State (NEA-2)

== Key ==
- **Bold** – Consensus All-American
- -1 – First-team selection
- -2 – Second-team selection
- -3 – Third-team selection

=== Official selectors ===
- AFCA – American Football Coaches Association, selected by more than 2,000 members for Kodak
- AP – Associated Press
- FWAA – Football Writers Association of America
- UPI – United Press International

=== Other selectors ===
- FN – Football News
- NEA – Newspaper Enterprise Association
- TSN – The Sporting News
- WC – Walter Camp Football Foundation

== See also ==
- 1977 All-Atlantic Coast Conference football team
- 1977 All-Big Eight Conference football team
- 1977 All-Big Ten Conference football team
- 1977 All-Pacific-8 Conference football team
- 1977 All-SEC football team
- 1977 All-Southwest Conference football team
