= 1976 All-East football team =

American college football all-star team

The 1976 All-East football team consists of American football players chosen by various selectors as the best players at each position among the Eastern colleges and universities during the 1976 NCAA Division I football season.

The undefeated 1976 Pittsburgh Panthers football team won the national championship and placed 10 players on the All-Eastern first-team selections of the AP and UPI. Pitt running back Tony Dorsett also won the 1976 Heisman Trophy.

== Offense ==
=== Quarterback ===
- Leamon Hall, Army (AP-2, UPI-1)
- Paul Michalko, Brown (AP-1)

=== Running backs ===
- Tony Dorsett, Pitt (AP-1, UPI-1)
- John Pagliaro, Yale (AP-1, UPI-1)
- Glen Capriola, Boston College (AP-2, UPI-1)
- Carson Long, Pitt (UPI-1)
- Anthony Anderson, Temple (AP-2)

=== Tight end ===
- Clennie Brundidge, Army (AP-2, UPI-1)
- James Corbett, Pitt (AP-1)

=== Wide receivers ===
- Bob Farnham, Brown (AP-1, UPI-1)
- Steve Lewis, West Virginia (AP-1)
- Mark Twitty, Rutgers (AP-2)
- Harry Wilson, Dartmouth (AP-2)

=== Tackles ===
- George Reihner, Penn State (AP-1, UPI-1)
- Brad Benson, Penn State (AP-2, UPI-1)
- John Hanhauser, Pitt (AP-1)
- Pat Sullivan, Dartmouth (AP-2)

=== Guards ===
- Tom Brzoza, Pitt (AP-1, UPI-1)
- Steve Schindler, Boston College (AP-1, UPI-1)
- Steve Carfora, Yale (AP-2)
- Pat Staub, Temple (AP-2)

=== Center ===
- Chuck Lodge, Villanova (AP-1)
- John Pelusi, Pitt (UPI-1)
- Michael Foley, Colgate (AP-2)

== Defense ==
=== Ends ===
- Nate Toran, Rutgers (AP-1, UPI-1)
- Cecil Johnson, Pitt (AP-1)
- Byron Hemingway, Boston College (UPI-1)
- Ron Crosby, Penn State (AP-2)
- Chuck Schott, Army (AP-2)

=== Tackles ===
- John Alexander, Rutgers (AP-1, UPI-1)
- Randy Holloway, Pitt (AP-1, UPI-1)
- Don Parrish, Pitt (AP-2)
- Chuck Smith, West Virginia (AP-2)

=== Middle guard ===
- Al Romano, Pitt (AP-1, UPI-1)
- Jeff Sapp, Navy (AP-2)

=== Linebackers ===
- Kurt Allerman, Penn State (AP-1, UPI-1)
- Peter Cronan, Boston College (AP-2, UPI-1)
- Bob Walls, Boston College (AP-1)
- Doug Curtis, Colgate (AP-1)
- Ken Culbertson, West Virginia (UPI-1)
- Jim Hughes, Rutgers (AP-2)
- Tom Joyce, Harvard (AP-2)

=== Defensive backs ===
- Gary Petercuskie, Penn State (AP-1, UPI-1)
- Bob Jury, Pitt (AP-1, UPI-1)
- Tim Moresco, Syracuse (AP-1, UPI-1)
- Ed Backus, Columbia (AP-2)
- Kelly Elias, Boston College (AP-2)
- Henry Jenkins, Rutgers (AP-2)

== Key ==
- AP = Associated Press
- UPI = United Press International

== See also ==
- 1976 College Football All-America Team
