= 1977 All-East football team =

American college football all-star team

The 1977 All-East football team consists of American football players chosen by various selectors as the best players at each position among the Eastern colleges and universities during the 1977 NCAA Division I football season.

== Offense ==
=== Quarterback ===
- Leamon Hall, Army (AP-1)
- Matt Cavanaugh, Pitt (UPI-1)
- Bill Hurley, Syracuse (AP-2)

=== Running backs ===
- John Pagliaro, Yale (AP-1; UPI-1)
- Henry White, Colgate (AP-2; UPI-1)
- Joe Gattuso, Navy (AP-1)
- Elliott Walker, Pitt (UPI-1)
- Vince Thompson, Villanova (AP-2)

=== Tight end ===
- Mickey Shuler, Penn State (AP-1)
- Steve Gaustad, Pitt (AP-2)

=== Wide receivers ===
- Clennie Brundidge, Army (AP-1; UPI-1)
- Gordon Jones, Pitt (AP-1; UPI-1)
- Jimmy Cefalo, Penn State (AP-2)
- Steve Watson, Temple (AP-2)

=== Tackles ===
- Keith Dorney, Penn State (AP-1; UPI-1)
- Matt Carroll, Pitt (AP-1)
- Rick Doell, Colgate (UPI-1)
- Jim McDonnell, Yale (AP-2)
- Joe Oliver, Army (AP-2)

=== Guards ===
- Steve Carfora, Yale (AP-1; UPI-1)
- John Schmeding, Boston College (AP-1; UPI-1)
- Bob Hurley, Holy Cross (AP-2)
- Ken Zunic, Villanova (AP-2)

=== Center ===
- Tom Brzoza, Pitt (AP-1; UPI-1)
- Michael Foley, Colgate (AP-2)

=== Kicker ===
- Dave Jacobs, Syracuse (UPI-1)

== Defense ==
=== Ends ===
- Hugh Green, Pitt (AP-1; UPI-1)
- Chuck Schott, Army (AP-1)
- Bill Banks, Penn State (UPI-1)
- Bob Baggott, Harvard (AP-2)
- Gary Hartwig, Colgate (AP-2)

=== Tackles ===
- Randy Holloway, Pitt (AP-1; UPI-1)
- Ken Clarke, Syracuse (AP-1)
- Gregg Robinson, Dartmouth (UPI-1)
- Dan Gray, Rutgers (AP-2)
- Fred Smerlas, Boston College (AP-2)

=== Middle guard ===
- Randy Sidler, Penn State (AP-1; UPI-1)
- Joe Jelich, West Virginia (AP-2)

=== Linebackers ===
- Rick Donaldson, Penn State (AP-1; UPI-1)
- Rich Scudellari, Boston College (AP-1; UPI-1)
- Doug Curtis, Colgate (AP-1)
- Ron Hostetler, Penn State (UPI-1)
- Al Chesley, Pitt (AP-2)
- John Hilliard, Army (AP-2)
- Jeff Macerelli, West Virginia (AP-2)

=== Defensive backs ===
- Bob Jury, Pitt (AP-1; UPI-1)
- Larry King, Syracuse (AP-1; UPI-1)
- John Sturges, Navy (AP-1; UPI-1)
- Mike Galpin, Navy (AP-2)
- Neil Hutton, Penn State (AP-2)
- J. C. Wilson, Pitt (AP-2)

=== Punters ===
- Jim Walton, Boston College (UPI-1)

== Key ==
- AP = Associated Press
- UPI = United Press International

== See also ==
- 1977 College Football All-America Team
