= 1977 Gator Bowl =

American college football game

Pittsburgh Panthers	Clemson Tigers
(8–2–1)	(8–2–1)
Independent	ACC
34	3
Head coach: Jackie Sherrill	Head coach: Charley Pell
AP / Coaches; 10 / 9	AP / Coaches; 11 / 10
	1	2	3	4	Total
Pittsburgh	10	7	7	10	34
Clemson	0	3	0	0	3
- Date: December 30, 1977
- Season: 1977
- Stadium: Gator Bowl Stadium
- Location: Jacksonville, Florida
- MVP: Matt Cavanaugh (QB, Pitt) & Jerry Butler (SE, Clemson)
- Referee: James M. Artley (SEC)
- Attendance: 72,289

United States TV coverage
- Network: ABC
- Announcers: Keith Jackson, Frank Broyles

The 1977 Gator Bowl was a college football bowl game played between the Pittsburgh Panthers and Clemson Tigers on December 30, 1977. The 10th-ranked Panthers defeated the 11th-ranked Tigers, 34–3. Panthers quarterback Matt Cavanaugh broke the Gator Bowl record for passing yards with 387 yards, breaking the previous record of 362 yards set by Florida State's Kim Hammond in 1967.
