= Carson Long =

American football player (born 1954)

No. 5
- Position: Placekicker

Personal information
- Born: December 16, 1954 (age 71); Pottsville, Pennsylvania, U.S.
- Listed height: 5 ft 10 in (1.78 m)
- Listed weight: 210 lb (95 kg)

Career information
- High school: North Schuylkill
- College: Pittsburgh
- NFL draft: 1977: 11th round, 302 (by the Los Angeles Rams)th overall pick

Career history
- Buffalo Bills (1977)

Awards and highlights
- National champion (1976); Second-team All-American (1976); First-team All-East (1976)

Career NFL statistics
- Field goals: 7
- Field goal attempts: 11
- Field goal %: 63.6
- Longest field goal: 45
- Stats at Pro Football Reference

Carson Gerald Long (born December 16, 1954) is an American former professional football player who was a placekicker for the Buffalo Bills of the National Football League (NFL). He played college football for the Pittsburgh Panthers.

He played 9 games in 1977 and made 7 out of his 11 field goal attempts.
