= Steve Schindler =

American football player (born 1954)

No. 67
- Position: Guard

Personal information
- Born: July 24, 1954 (age 72); Caldwell, New Jersey, U.S.
- Listed height: 6 ft 3 in (1.91 m)
- Listed weight: 256 lb (116 kg)

Career information
- High school: Conestoga (Berwyn, Pennsylvania)
- College: Boston College
- NFL draft: 1977: 1st round, 18th overall pick

Career history
- Denver Broncos (1977–1978)

Awards and highlights
- First-team All-American (1976); First-team All-East (1976)

Career NFL statistics
- Games played: 28
- Games started: 4
- Stats at Pro Football Reference

Steven Wayne Schindler (born July 24, 1954) is an American former professional football player who was a guard for two seasons with the Denver Broncos of the National Football League (NFL). The Broncos selected him in the 1977 NFL draft with the 18th overall pick.

== College career ==
Schindler played college football for the Boston College Eagles and was a three-year starter. He was selected to multiple 1st team All-American lists in 1976, including those published by the Football Writers Association, the Newspaper Enterprise Association, The Sporting News and Football News.

Schindler was inducted into the Boston College Varsity Club Athletic Hall of Fame in 1998.
