= George Reihner =

American football player (1955–2021)

No. 64
- Position: Guard

Personal information
- Born: April 27, 1955; Pittsburgh, Pennsylvania, U.S.
- Died: March 11, 2021 (aged 65); Scranton, Pennsylvania, U.S.
- Listed height: 6 ft 4 in (1.93 m)
- Listed weight: 263 lb (119 kg)

Career information
- College: Penn State
- NFL draft: 1977: 2nd round, 38th overall pick

Career history
- Houston Oilers (1977–1979, 1982)

Awards and highlights
- PFWA All-Rookie Team (1977); First-team All-East (1976)

Career NFL statistics
- Games played: 27
- Games started: 23
- Fumble recoveries: 1
- Stats at Pro Football Reference

George Arthur Reihner (April 27, 1955 – March 11, 2021) was an American professional football player who played who was an offensive guard for four seasons with the Houston Oilers of the National Football League (NFL). He played college football for the Penn State Nittany Lions. After his football career, he became a prominent attorney in northeastern Pennsylvania.

== Early life and college ==
Born in Pittsburgh, Pennsylvania, on April 27, 1955, Reihner graduated from Washington High School in Washington, Pennsylvania in 1973. During his senior year, Reihner played an influential part in the Prexies football team, helping it to reach the WPIAL Class AA Semi-Finals. His post-season honors included being named All-State and voted WPIAL Most Valuable Lineman. He was also named captain of the Big 33 Pennsylvania team that defeated the Ohio All-Stars, 21–19.

A three-year starter at guard for coach Joe Paterno's offense at Pennsylvania State University, Reihner played in four bowl games (Orange, Cotton, Sugar, Gator), as well as in the Senior Bowl. Prior to the 1976 season, Reihner was named team captain for the Nittany Lions. In 1975 and 1976, he was named 1st Team, All East. In 1976, Reihner received 2nd Team All-Honors.

After a successful playing career at Penn State, he was the chosen in the second round of the 1977 NFL draft (38th pick overall).

== NFL career ==
Reihner played in thirteen games during his rookie season with the National Football League and was named the American Football Conference Offensive Rookie of the Year. He also made the NFL's All-Rookie team.

In 1979, Reihner was part of the Houston offensive line that won the league's Outstanding Offensive Line award. The Oilers line became the first NFL unit in the same season to produce the league's leading rusher (Earl Campbell) and giving up the fewest quarterback sacks (twelve).

A back injury cut Reihner's professional career short. He retired after the 1982 season after having played in twenty-seven games for the Oilers.

== Legal career ==
In 1984, Reihner graduated from Dickinson School of Law. Employed initially as a Pennsylvania Superior Court law clerk, he subsequently became a prominent lawyer in Scranton.
