= Dan Irons =

American football player (born 1954)

Profile
- Position: OT

Personal information
- Born: December 31, 1954 (age 71); Tyler, Texas, U.S.
- Listed height: 6 ft 7 in (2.01 m)
- Listed weight: 260 lb (118 kg)

Career information
- High school: Monterey
- College: Texas Tech University
- NFL draft: 1978: 12th round, 314th overall pick

Career history
- 1975–1977: Texas Tech

Awards and highlights
- Consensus All-American (1977); 2× First-team All-SWC (1976, 1977)

Dan Irons (born December 31, 1954) is an American former football offensive tackle who played for the Texas Tech Red Raiders football team and was recognized as a consensus All-American in 1977.

== Early life ==
Irons was born in Tyler, Texas on December 31, 1954. He is the son of Ed Irons, who played football and basketball at Texas Tech from 1938 to 1942 and was superintendent of Lubbock Independent School District. The family later moved to Lubbock, Texas and Dan graduated from Monterey High School in 1973. At Monterey, he earned all-state honors in both football and basketball.

== Playing career ==
Irons played for the Texas Tech Red Raiders football team under coach Steve Sloan during the 1975, 1976 and 1977 seasons. In 1975, as a starter on the offensive line, he helped the Red Raiders lead the Southwest Conference in total yards. He made the All-SWC team in both the 1976 and 1977 seasons. Following his senior year, as a 6-foot, 7-inch, 260-pound tackle, he was recognized as a consensus first-team All-American, having received first-team honors from several publications and organizations including the American Football Coaches Association and United Press International (UPI). Irons was drafted by the San Francisco 49ers in the 12th round (314th overall selection) of the 1978 NFL draft. He was unable to play professionally due to recurring knee problems. In 1999, he was inducted into the Texas Tech University Athletic Hall of Honor with Curtis Jordan, Gary Ashby and Jack Alderson. Both Jordan and Ashby attended Monterey High School with Irons.

== After football ==
After leaving Texas Tech, Irons moved to Midland, Texas and worked in sales of school furniture and supplies. He is the father of Erin Irons, who was a swimmer for Texas Christian University in the early 2000s.
