= Keith Dorney =

American football player (born 1957)

No. 70
- Position: Offensive tackle

Personal information
- Born: December 3, 1957 (age 68); Allentown, Pennsylvania, U.S.
- Listed height: 6 ft 5 in (1.96 m)
- Listed weight: 268 lb (122 kg)

Career information
- High school: Emmaus (Emmaus, Pennsylvania)
- College: Penn State
- NFL draft: 1979: 1st round, 10th overall pick

Career history
- Detroit Lions (1979–1987)

Awards and highlights
- Pro Bowl (1982); PFWA All-Rookie Team (1979); Unanimous All-American (1978); First-team All-American (1977); 2× First-team All-East (1977, 1978)

Career NFL statistics
- Games played: 112
- Games started: 110
- Fumble recoveries: 1
- Stats at Pro Football Reference
- College Football Hall of Fame

Keith Robert Dorney (born December 3, 1957) is an American former professional football player who was an offensive tackle for nine seasons in the National Football League (NFL) from 1979 to 1987.

He played college football for the Penn State Nittany Lions, earning consensus All-American honors in 1978. In the 1979 NFL draft, Dorney was selected in the first round by the Detroit Lions, where he played for his entire professional career.

== Early life ==
Dorney was born in Allentown, Pennsylvania. He grew up in Macungie, Pennsylvania in the Lehigh Valley region of eastern Pennsylvania. He played high school football at Emmaus High School in Emmaus, Pennsylvania, which competed in the East Penn Conference and is known for its success in producing collegiate and NFL football talent.

In his autobiography, Black and Honolulu Blue: In the Trenches of the NFL, Dorney dramatically recounts playing for Emmaus, including one play in which he simultaneously tackled the opposing quarterback and running back during a handoff in a goal line stand. It resulted in a serious concussion that produced some minor anterograde amnesia.

== College career ==
Dorney attended Pennsylvania State University, where he played for coach Joe Paterno's Nittany Lions football team from 1975 through 1978.

As a senior in 1978, Dorney was recognized as both a consensus first-team All-American and an Academic All-American. He earned a Bachelor of Science in insurance and real estate from Penn State in 1979, and a Master of Education from the University of San Francisco. In 2005, in tribute of his play at Penn State, Dorney was inducted into the College Football Hall of Fame.

== Professional career ==
Following his Penn State football career, Dorney entered the 1979 NFL draft and was selected by the Detroit Lions in the first round with the tenth overall selection. He played in the NFL for nine years, from 1979 to 1987, and played both offensive guard and offensive tackle for the Lions.

Dorney was also the offensive captain of the Detroit Lions from 1983 to 1987 and was selected to the 1982 Pro Bowl.

Dorney's NFL career was highlighted by his role as a lead blocker for NFL rushing great Billy Sims, who rushed for 5,106 yards over his five-year career with the Lions.

== Personal life ==
Dorney's autobiography, Black and Honolulu Blue: In the Trenches of the NFL, chronicles his life and football career.

From 2003 to 2006, Dorney was on the faculty of Cardinal Newman High School in Santa Rosa, California, where he taught freshman English. Dorney and Hall of Fame quarterback Joe Montana both provided Cardinal Newman with periodic coaching support.
