= Position coach =

Team official in charge of coaching a specific position group

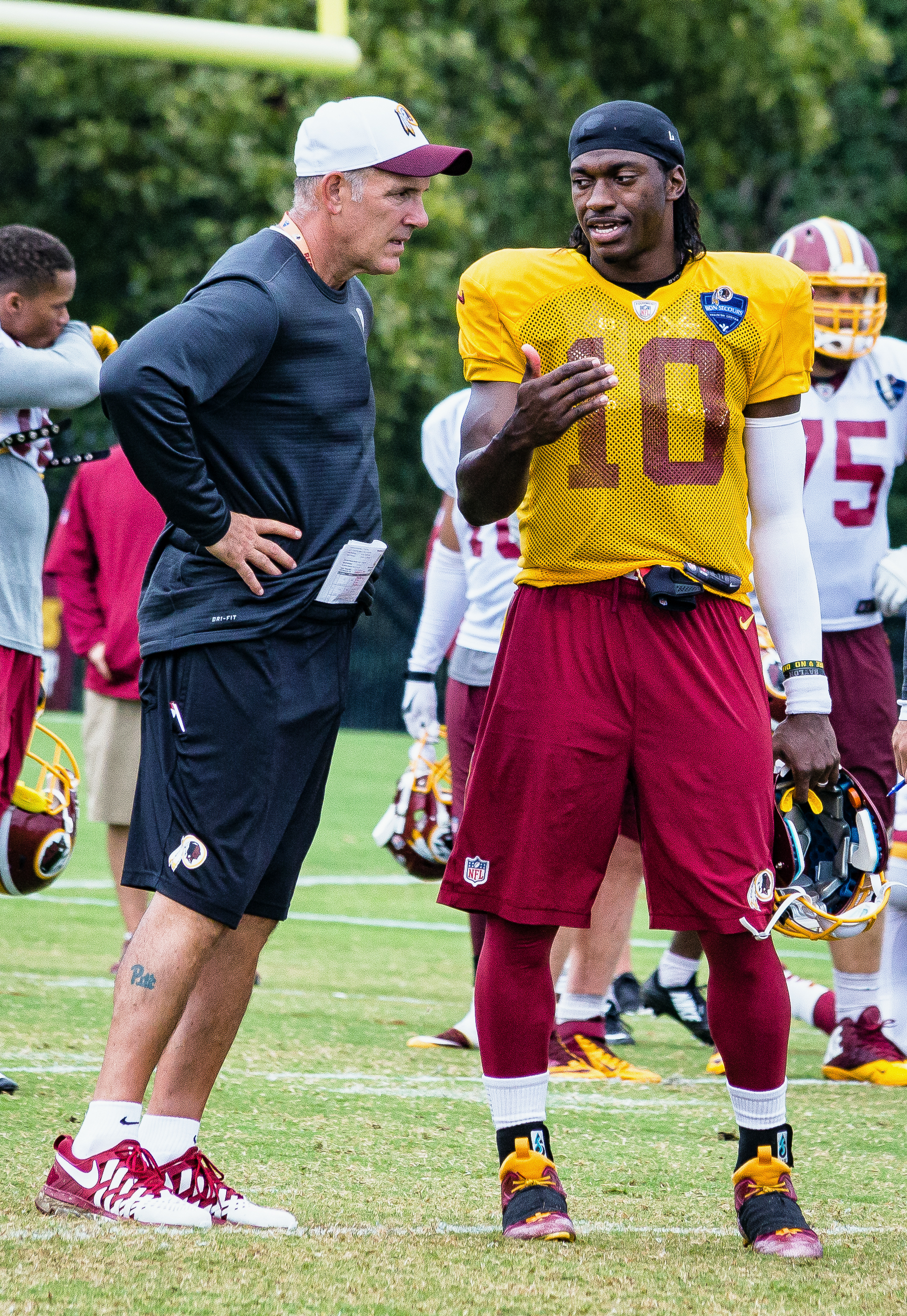
Washington Redskins quarterback Robert Griffin III with position coach Matt Cavanaugh (left), 2015

In American football, a position coach is a team official in charge of coaching a specific position group. Position coaches have more specialized duties than the head coach, associate and assistant coach, and the offensive and defensive coordinators.

During games position coaches monitor the performance of their assigned players and communicate observations to other members of the coaching staff. They work with coordinaters to help carry out the opposing teams game plan and make adjustments when needed. The specific job of a position can change depending the opposing teams game plan and level of play.

== Common positions ==
Common position coaches on coaching staffs in the National Football League and NCAA football include:

- Defensive line (DL) coach
- Linebacker (LB) coach
- Offensive line (OL) coach
- Quarterback (QB) coach
- Running back (RB) coach
- Defensive back (DB) coach. Responsible for coaching the secondary, including safeties and cornerbacks
- Special teams (ST) coach. Responsible for coordinating punts, kickoffs, and field goals/extra points
- Tight end (TE) coach
- Wide receiver (WR) coach
