= Randy Sidler =

American football player (born 1956)

Profile
- Position: Defensive tackle

Personal information
- Born: February 4, 1956 (age 70); Bloomsburg, Pennsylvania, U.S.

Career information
- High school: Danville (PA)
- College: Penn State
- NFL draft: 1978: 5th round, 113th overall pick

Career history
- New York Jets (1978)*; Washington Redskins (1979)*
- * Offseason or practice squad member only

Awards and highlights
- First-team All-American (1977); First-team All-East (1977)

Randall Kevin Sidler (born February 4, 1956) is a former professional American football player. Sidler was selected 113th overall by the New York Jets in the fifth round of the 1978 NFL draft but never played an NFL game. He left the Jets training camp and took a break from football. The Washington Redskins then traded for him, but he did not represent them either.

He was named first-team All-American in 1977 after amassing 65 tackles and four sacks during his career as a nose guard at Penn State.

Sidler is a graduate Danville High School in Danville, Pennsylvania, where his football jersey has been retired.
