= John Chesley (American football) =

American football player (born 1962)

No. 86
- Position: Tight end

Personal information
- Born: July 2, 1962 (age 64); Washington, D.C., U.S.
- Listed height: 6 ft 5 in (1.96 m)
- Listed weight: 225 lb (102 kg)

Career information
- High school: Eastern (Washington D.C.)
- College: Oklahoma State
- NFL draft: 1984: undrafted

Career history
- Miami Dolphins (1984); Denver Broncos (1986)*
- * Offseason or practice squad member only

Awards and highlights
- Second-team All-Big Eight (1983)
- Stats at Pro Football Reference

John Kenneth Chesley (born July 2, 1962) is an American former professional football tight end who played for the Miami Dolphins of the National Football League (NFL). He played college football for the Oklahoma State Cowboys and was selected by the Dolphins in the 10th round of the 1984 NFL draft.

== Early life ==
John Kenneth Chesley was born on July 2, 1962, in Washington, D.C. He attended Eastern High School in Washington D.C.

== College career ==
Chesley enrolled at Oklahoma State University to play college football for the Cowboys. He was a four-year letterman from 1980 to 1983, playing 44 of 46 games for the Cowboys during that span. He caught 76 career passes for 934 yards and eight touchdowns. Chesley's four receiving touchdowns in 1981 were the most in the Big Eight Conference. He was named second-team All-Big Eight by the Associated Press as a senior in 1983.

== Professional career ==
Chesley was selected by the Miami Dolphins in the 10th round, with the 277th overall pick, of the 1984 NFL draft. He signed with the team on July 9. He was released on August 27, after the final preseason game, but re-signed on October 19. He played in one game for the Dolphins as a reserve tight end and was targeted once. Chesley was released on November 2, 1984. He signed with Miami again on April 11, 1985. He was released again on September 2, 1985, before the start of the regular season.

Chesley signed with the Denver Broncos on April 23, 1986. He was released on July 25, 1986, during training camp.

== Personal life ==
Chesley's brothers, Frank and Al, also played in the NFL. In May 1985, John's car collided with another car. He had an argument with the driver of the other car and hit her in the face. In September 1985, Chesley was found guilty of assault and battery and fined $50.
