= Ken Clarke (American football) =

American football player (born 1956)

No. 71, 67
- Position: Defensive tackle

Personal information
- Born: August 28, 1956 (age 70); Savannah, Georgia, U.S.
- Listed height: 6 ft 2 in (1.88 m)
- Listed weight: 268 lb (122 kg)

Career information
- High school: English (Boston, Massachusetts)
- College: Syracuse
- NFL draft: 1978: undrafted

Career history
- Philadelphia Eagles (1978–1987); Seattle Seahawks (1988); Minnesota Vikings (1989–1991)

Awards and highlights
- First-team All-East (1977)

Career NFL statistics
- Sacks: 59
- Fumble recoveries: 9
- Safeties: 1
- Stats at Pro Football Reference

Kenneth Maurice Clarke (born August 28, 1956) is an American former professional football player who was a defensive tackle for 14 seasons in the National Football League (NFL). He played in Super Bowl XV for the Philadelphia Eagles.

Clarke played college football for the Syracuse Orange, also as a defensive tackle. He twice received an honorable mention in the AP All-America rankings and was selected to the All-East first team.
