= 1977 All-Southwest Conference football team =

American college football all-star team

The 1977 All-Southwest Conference football team consists of American football players chosen, at each position, as the best players in the Southwest Conference during the 1974 NCAA Division I football season. The selectors for the 1977 season included the United Press International (UPI).

== All Southwest selections ==
=== Offense ===
==== Quarterbacks ====
- Ron Calcagni, Arkansas (UPI-1)
- Randy McEachern, Texas (UPI-2)

==== Running backs ====
- Earl Campbell, Texas (UPI-1)
- Ben Cowins, Arkansas (UPI-1)
- George Woodard, Texas A&M (UPI-2)
- Alois Blackwell, Houston (UPI-2)

==== Tight ends ====
- Don Bass, Houston (UPI-1)
- Ronnie Lee, Baylor (UPI-2)

==== Wide Receivers ====
- Mike Renfro, TCU (UPI-1)
- Emanuel Tolbert, SMU (UPI-1)
- Alfred Jackson, Texas (UPI-2)
- David Houser, Rice (UPI-2)

==== Offensive tackles ====
- Dan Irons, Texas Tech (UPI-1)
- Frank Myers, Texas A&M (UPI-1)
- Kevin Rollwage, Houston (UPI-2)
- Cody Risien, Texas A&M (UPI-2)

==== Offensive guards ====
- Rick Ingraham, Texas (UPI-1)
- Leotis Harris, Arkansas (UPI-1)
- Jon Kramer, Baylor (UPI-2)
- Jim Yarbrough, Texas (UPI-2)

==== Centers ====
- Mark Dennard, Texas A&M (UPI-1)
- Wes Hubert, Texas (UPI-2)

==== Placekickers ====
- Steve Little, Arkansas (UPI-1)
- Russell Erxleben, Texas (UPI-2)

==== Punters ====
- Russell Erxleben, Texas (UPI-1)
- Steve Little, Arkansas (UPI-2)

=== Defense ===
==== Defensive ends ====
- Richard Arledge, Texas Tech (UPI-1)
- Tim Campbell, Texas (UPI-1)
- Reid Hansen, Houston (UPI-2)
- Jerry Saxton, Arkansas (UPI-2)

==== Defensive tackles ====
- Brad Shearer, Texas (UPI-1)
- Jimmy Walker, Arkansas (UPI-1)
- Dan Hampton, Arkansas (UPI-2)
- Steve McMichael, Texas (UPI-2)

==== Linebackers ====
- Larry Jackson, Arkansas (UPI-1)
- Mike Mock, Texas Tech (UPI-1)
- Putt Choate, SMU (UPI-1)
- Joe Bevill, Rice (UPI-2)
- Lance Taylor, Texas (UPI-2)
- Kevin Monk, Texas A&M (UPI-2)

==== Defensive backs ====
- Johnnie Johnson, Texas (UPI-1)
- Carl Grulich, Texas A&M (UPI-1)
- Patrick Martin, Arkansas (UPI-1)
- Vaughn Lusby, Arkansas (UPI-1)
- Ricky Churchman, Texas (UPI-2)
- Harold Perry, SMU (UPI-2)
- Eric Felton, Texas Tech (UPI-2)
- Anthony Francis, Houston (UPI-2)

== Key ==
UPI = United Press International

== See also ==
- 1977 College Football All-America Team
