= Frank Chesley =

American football player (born 1955)

No. 53
- Position: Linebacker

Personal information
- Born: July 14, 1955 (age 71); Washington, D.C., U.S.
- Listed height: 6 ft 3 in (1.91 m)
- Listed weight: 219 lb (99 kg)

Career information
- High school: Eastern (Washington D.C.)
- College: Wyoming
- NFL draft: 1978: 6th round, 157th overall pick

Career history
- Green Bay Packers (1978)

Career NFL statistics
- Games played: 1
- Stats at Pro Football Reference

Francis Michael Chesley (born July 14, 1955) is a former linebacker in the National Football League (NFL). Chesley was born on July 14, 1955 in Washington, D.C., where he attended Eastern High School. After a chance encounter with a track-and-field coach from the University of Wyoming, Chesley started attending the school and played baseball for one season. After quitting baseball, he walked-on to the school's football team. After starting out as a safety and a tight end, injuries opened up a defensive end position, where Chesley eventually flourished and became a starter.

Chesley was drafted 157th overall in the sixth round of the 1978 NFL draft by the New Orleans Saints, the only player from his college team selected in the draft. After sustaining an injury before the season and missing a few weeks of practices, Chesley was released by the Saints. The Green Bay Packers signed Chesley late in the 1978 NFL season after a number of injuries to their linebackers. Chesley played one game for the Packers. He is a brother to fellow NFL players Al Chesley and John Chesley.
