= Leotis Harris =

American football player (born 1955)

No. 69
- Position: Guard

Personal information
- Born: June 28, 1955 (age 71); Little Rock, Arkansas, U.S.
- Listed height: 6 ft 1 in (1.85 m)
- Listed weight: 267 lb (121 kg)

Career information
- High school: Hall (Little Rock)
- College: Arkansas
- NFL draft: 1978: 6th round, 144th overall pick

Career history
- Green Bay Packers (1978–1984)

Awards and highlights
- Consensus All-American (1977); First-team All-SWC (1977); Second-team All-SWC (1976)

Career NFL statistics
- Games played: 74
- Games started: 55
- Fumble recoveries: 3
- Stats at Pro Football Reference

Leotis Harris (born June 28, 1955) is an American former professional football player who spent his entire six-year career as an offensive guard for the Green Bay Packers of the National Football League (NFL). He played college football for the Arkansas Razorbacks, earning consensus All-American honors in 1977.
