= Brad Shearer =

American football player (born 1955)

No. 72
- Position: Defensive tackle

Personal information
- Born: August 10, 1955 (age 71); Houston, Texas, U.S.
- Listed height: 6 ft 3 in (1.91 m)
- Listed weight: 250 lb (113 kg)

Career information
- High school: Westlake (Austin, Texas)
- College: Texas
- NFL draft: 1978: 3rd round, 74th overall pick

Career history
- Chicago Bears (1978–1981)

Awards and highlights
- Outland Trophy (1977); Unanimous All-American (1977); 2× First-team All-SWC (1975, 1977); SWC All-Decade Team (1970s)

Career NFL statistics
- Sacks: 1
- Stats at Pro Football Reference

Sterling Bradford Shearer (born August 10, 1955) is an American former professional football player who was a defensive lineman for three seasons with the Chicago Bears of the National Football League (NFL). He played college football for the Texas Longhorns, earning unanimous All-American honors and recognition as the best college interior lineman in the country in 1977. A third-round pick in the 1978 NFL draft, he played professionally for the NFL's Chicago Bears.

== Early life ==
Shearer was born in Houston, Texas. He graduated from Westlake High School in Westlake Hills, Texas, a suburb of Austin, where he played for the Westlake Chaparrals high school football team.

== College career ==
Shearer received an athletic scholarship to attend the University of Texas at Austin, where he played for the Texas Longhorns football team from 1974 to 1977. He was a two-time All-Southwestern Conference selection in (1975, 1977), As a senior team captain in 1977, he averaged ten tackles per game, led the Longhorns to a No. 1 ranking, and was recognized as a consensus first-team All-American. He was also awarded the Outland Trophy, recognizing him as the best interior lineman during the 1977 college football season.

== Professional career ==
The Chicago Bears picked Shearer in the third round (74th pick overall) of the 1978 NFL draft, and he played for the Bears from 1978 to 1981. In three NFL seasons, he appeared in thirty-four regular season games for the Bears, and started two of them. He did not play during the 1979 regular season, and his pro career was later cut short by a knee injury.

== See also ==
- 1977 College Football All-America Team
- List of Texas Longhorns football All-Americans
- Texas Longhorns
