= Jim Corbett (American football) =

American football player (born 1955)

James Corbett
No. 81
- Position: Tight end

Personal information
- Born: February 22, 1955 (age 71); Brockton, Massachusetts, U.S.
- Listed height: 6 ft 4 in (1.93 m)
- Listed weight: 218 lb (99 kg)

Career information
- High school: McDowell (Millcreek Township, Pennsylvania)
- College: Pittsburgh (1972–1975)
- NFL draft: 1977: 7th round, 194th overall pick

Career history
- Cincinnati Bengals (1977–1980)

Awards and highlights
- National champion (1976); Second-team All-American (1976); 2× First-team All-East (1975, 1976)

Career NFL statistics
- Receptions: 25
- Receiving yards: 376
- Receiving TDs: 1
- Stats at Pro Football Reference

James B. Corbett (born February 22, 1955) is an American former professional football player who was a tight end for four seasons with the Cincinnati Bengals of the National Football League (NFL). He was selected by the Bengals in the seventh round of the 1977 NFL draft. He played college football for the Pittsburgh Panthers.

== Early life ==
James B. Corbett was born on February 22, 1955, in Brockton, Massachusetts. He attended McDowell High School in Millcreek Township, Erie County, Pennsylvania.

== College career ==
Corbett was a four-year letterman for the Pittsburgh Panthers of the University of Pittsburgh from 1973 to 1976. He caught two passes for 25 yards in 1973, 16 passes for 202 yards and one touchdown in 1974, 22 passes for 317 yards and two touchdowns in 1975, and 33 passes for 528 yards and two touchdowns in 1976. He earned Associated Press (AP) and United Press International first-team All-East honors in 1975 and AP first-team All-East honors in 1976. In 1976, the Panthers were named consensus national champions and Corbett was named an AP second-team All-American.

== Professional career ==
Corbett was selected by the Cincinnati Bengals in the seventh round, with the 194th overall pick, of the 1977 NFL draft. He officially signed with the team on May 23. He played in all 14 games, starting three, for the Bengals during his rookie year in 1977, recording seven receptions for 127 yards and one touchdown. Corbett appeared in all 16 games, starting five, during the 1978 season, catching 12 passes for 187 yards. He played in ten games, starting one, in 1979, catching three passes for 34 yards. He missed part of the 1979 season due to injury. Corbett was released on August 21, 1980. He was later re-signed on October 29 and appeared in four games that year, totaling three receptions for 28 yards, before being placed on injured reserve on November 25, 1980. He became a free agent after the season.
