= Eric Felton =

American football player (born 1955)

No. 20, 22
- Position: Cornerback

Personal information
- Born: October 8, 1955 (age 71); Austin, Texas, U.S.
- Listed height: 6 ft 0 in (1.83 m)
- Listed weight: 200 lb (91 kg)

Career information
- High school: Lubbock (Lubbock, Texas)
- College: Texas Tech (1974–1977)
- NFL draft: 1978: 5th round, 115th overall pick

Career history
- New Orleans Saints (1978–1979); New York Giants (1980)

Awards and highlights
- Second-team All-SWC (1977)
- Stats at Pro Football Reference

Eric Norman Felton (born October 8, 1955) is an American former professional football cornerback who played three seasons in the National Football League (NFL) with the New Orleans Saints and New York Giants. He was selected by the Saints in the fifth round of the 1978 NFL draft after played college football at Texas Tech University.

== Early life ==
Eric Norman Felton was born on October 8, 1955, in Austin, Texas. He attended Lubbock High School in Lubbock, Texas.

== College career ==
Felton was a member of the Texas Tech Red Raiders of Texas Tech University from 1974 to 1977 and a three-year letterman from 1975 to 1977. In 1976, he returned thee interceptions for 69 yards and four punts for 21 yards. As a senior in 1977, he returned one interception for two yards and one punt for 11 yards and one touchdown. He was named second-team All-SWC by United Press International in 1977.

== Professional career ==
Felton was selected by the New Orleans Saints in the fifth round, with the 115th overall pick, of the 1978 NFL draft. He played in all 16 games, starting two, for the Saints in 1978 and made one interception. He appeared in 13 games, starting ten, during the 1979 season, recording four interceptions for 53 yards. Felton was released by the Saints on August 26, 1980.

Felton signed with the New York Giants on November 12, 1980. He played in six games, starting three, for the Giants in 1980. He was released in 1981.
