= Frank Myers (American football) =

American football player (born 1956)

No. 74
- Position: Offensive tackle

Personal information
- Born: January 4, 1956 (age 70); San Bernardino, California, U.S.
- Listed height: 6 ft 5 in (1.96 m)
- Listed weight: 255 lb (116 kg)

Career information
- High school: Central (San Angelo, Texas)
- College: Texas A&M
- NFL draft: 1978: 5th round, 117th overall pick

Career history
- Baltimore Colts (1978)*; Minnesota Vikings (1978–1979)
- * Offseason or practice squad member only

Awards and highlights
- First-team All-SWC (1977); Second-team All-SWC (1976)

Career NFL statistics
- Games played: 26
- Games started: 11
- Fumble recoveries: 1
- Stats at Pro Football Reference

Franklin D. Myers (born January 4, 1956) is an American former professional football player who was an offensive tackle in the National Football League (NFL) for the Minnesota Vikings. Born in San Bernardino, California, he attended Central High School in San Angelo, Texas. He played college football for the Texas A&M Aggies, and was selected in the fifth round of the 1978 NFL draft by the Baltimore Colts with the 117th overall pick. Before the start of the 1978 season, he joined the Vikings, and played 12 times in his rookie year (11 starts). He played 14 times the following year, but did not start any games. His only statistical contribution in his two years in the league was a fumble recovery in a 34–10 playoff defeat against the Los Angeles Rams.

In 2007, Myers sued the Minnesota Vikings for loss of earnings relating to the treatment of injuries to his right hand and left wrist that caused him to suffer from Dupuytren's contracture and diminished his ability to work.
