= Don Parrish =

American football player (1955–2021)

No. 61
- Position: Defensive tackle

Personal information
- Born: April 6, 1955; Tallahassee, Florida, U.S.
- Died: May 8, 2021 (aged 66); Tallahassee, Florida, U.S.
- Listed height: 6 ft 2 in (1.88 m)
- Listed weight: 255 lb (116 kg)

Career information
- High school: Godby (Tallahassee)
- College: Pittsburgh
- NFL draft: 1977: 12th round, 314th overall pick

Career history
- Kansas City Chiefs (1978–1982)

Awards and highlights
- National champion (1976); Second-team All-East (1976)

Career NFL statistics
- Sacks: 13.5
- Fumble recoveries: 5
- Stats at Pro Football Reference

Donald Parrish (April 6, 1955 – May 8, 2021) was an American professional football player who was a defensive tackle in the National Football League (NFL) for the Kansas City Chiefs. He was selected by the Atlanta Falcons in the 12th round of the 1977 NFL draft. He played college football for the Pittsburgh Panthers and was part of their 1976 NCAA consensus national championship team.

He died on May 8, 2021, at age 66, in Tallahassee, Florida.
