= Al Romano =

American gridiron football player (born 1953)

No. 71
- Position: Defensive tackle

Personal information
- Born: April 4, 1954 (age 72); Schenectady, New York, U.S.
- Listed height: 6 ft 3 in (1.91 m)
- Listed weight: 225 lb (102 kg)

Career information
- High school: Solvay (Solvay, New York)
- College: Pittsburgh (1973–1976)
- NFL draft: 1977: 11th round, 289th overall pick

Career history
- 1977–1978: Hamilton Tiger-Cats
- 1978: Toronto Argonauts

Awards and highlights
- National champion (1976); Consensus All-American (1976); 2× First-team All-East (1975, 1976)

Albert Romano (born April 4, 1954) is an American former professional football defensive tackle who played two seasons in the Canadian Football League (CFL) with the Hamilton Tiger-Cats and Toronto Argonauts. He was selected by the Houston Oilers in the eleventh round of the 1977 NFL draft. Romano played college football at the University of Pittsburgh, where he was a consensus All-American in 1976.

== Early life ==
Albert Romano was born on April 4, 1954, in Schenectady, New York. He attended Solvay High School in Solvay, New York. He participated in football, track, and wrestling in high school. Romano was a football team captain during his junior and senior years and also earned all-county honors both seasons. He was inducted into the Greater Syracuse Sports Hall of Fame in 2011.

== College career ==
After a year of prep school in Virginia, Romano was a four-year letterman for the Pittsburgh Panthers of the University of Pittsburgh from 1973 to 1976. He was named the most valuable lineman of the 1975 Sun Bowl. He garnered consensus All-American recognition in 1976 as the 1976 Panthers were named consensus national champions. He was also named first-team All-East by the Associated Press (AP) in 1975 and first-team All-East by both the AP and United Press International in 1976. Romano was inducted into the Pitt Athletics Hall of Fame in 2024.

== Professional career ==
Romano was selected by the Houston Oilers in the eleventh round, with the 289th overall pick, of the 1977 NFL draft. He signed with the Oilers but was released later in 1977.

Romano played in eight games for the Hamilton Tiger-Cats of the Canadian Football League (CFL) in 1977, recovering one fumble. He appeared in three games in 1978.

Romano also played in six games for the Toronto Argonauts of the CFL during the 1978 season, recording one interception.
