= Jo Jo Heath =

American gridiron football player (1957–2002)

Joseph Leroy Heath, Jr. "JoJo"
No. 36, 29, 37
- Position: Defensive back

Personal information
- Born: March 9, 1957; Monessen, Pennsylvania, U.S.
- Died: December 30, 2002 (aged 45); Charleroi, Pennsylvania, U.S.
- Listed height: 5 ft 10 in (1.78 m)
- Listed weight: 182 lb (83 kg)

Career information
- High school: Monessen (PA)
- College: Pittsburgh
- NFL draft: 1980: 6th round, 141st overall pick

Career history
- Cincinnati Bengals (1980); Philadelphia Eagles (1981)*; Toronto Argonauts (1982); BC Lions (1983); Houston Gamblers (1984); Ottawa Rough Riders (1985); Los Angeles Raiders (1987); New York Jets (1987)
- * Offseason or practice squad member only

Awards and highlights
- National champion (1976); First-team All-East (1979)
- Stats at Pro Football Reference

Joseph Leroy Heath, Jr. "JoJo" (March 9, 1957 – December 30, 2002) was an American football defensive back who played three years in the National Football League (NFL), three years in the Canadian Football League (CFL), and one year in the United States Football League (USFL).

== Early life ==
The son of Joseph Leroy Heath, Sr. and Fannie Grogan Heath, JoJo grew up in Monessen, PA, a small city in Western Pennsylvania.

== Early life ==
A star athlete for the Monessen Greyhounds, he was a three-year starter in football and basketball. He also excelled in track and field. JoJo was also skilled in martial art and held a Black Belt in Karate.

== Recruiting ==
College career Highly sought after by several Division I college football teams, JoJo was recruited by the Pittsburgh and played for Pitt from 1976 to 1979.

Professional career In 1980, Heath was selected by the Cincinnati Bengals in the sixth round of the NFL Draft.

== Death ==
He was stabbed to death on December 30, 2002, in Charleroi, Pennsylvania at age 45.
