= Bob Jury =

American football player (born 1955)

No. 26
- Position: Safety

Personal information
- Born: October 5, 1955 (age 71); Los Angeles, California, U.S.
- Listed height: 6 ft 1 in (1.85 m)
- Listed weight: 188 lb (85 kg)

Career information
- High school: South Park (South Park Township, Pennsylvania)
- College: Pittsburgh (1974–1977)
- NFL draft: 1978: 3rd round, 63rd overall pick

Career history
- Seattle Seahawks (1978)*; San Francisco 49ers (1978–1979); New York Giants (1980)*; New England Patriots (1980)*
- * Offseason or practice squad member only

Awards and highlights
- National champion (1976); Consensus All-American (1977); Third-team All-American (1976); 2× First-team All-East (1976, 1977)

Career NFL statistics
- Fumble recoveries: 3
- Sacks: 1
- Stats at Pro Football Reference

Robert Vincent Jury (born October 5, 1955) is an American former professional football player who was a safety for one season with the San Francisco 49ers of the National Football League (NFL). He was selected by the Seattle Seahawks in the third round of the 1978 NFL draft. He played college football for the Pittsburgh Panthers.

== Early life ==
Robert Vincent Jury was born on October 5, 1955, in Los Angeles, California. He attended South Park High School in South Park, Pennsylvania.

== College career ==
He was a member of the Pittsburgh Panthers from 1974 to 1977 and a three-year letterman from 1975 to 1977. He led the country with ten interceptions in 1976, earning Associated Press (AP) third-team All-American and AP and United Press International (UPI) first-team All-East honors. The 1976 Panthers were named consensus national champions. He made six interceptions for 111 yards his senior year in 1977, garnering consensus All-American and AP and UPI first-team All East recognition. He is the Panthers' all-time leader in career interceptions (21), interceptions in a season (10) and interception return yards (266).

== Professional career ==
Jury was selected by the Seattle Seahawks in the third round, with the 63rd overall pick, of the 1978 NFL draft. He officially signed with the team on July 5, 1978.

On August 29, 1978, Jury and a 1979 third round draft pick were traded to the San Francisco 49ers for a 1979 third round pick. He played in 15 games, starting eight, for the 49ers during the 1978 season, recording one sack and three fumble recoveries. The next year, he was placed on injured reserve on August 23, 1979, and spent the entire season there. He was released by the 49ers on January 7, 1980.

Jury was claimed off waivers by the New York Giants on January 16, 1980, but was later waived.

He was claimed off waivers by the New England Patriots on May 19, 1980. He was released by the Patriots on July 23, 1980, after leaving the team.
