= Tom Brzoza =

American football player (born 1956)

Profile
- Positions: Center, guard

Personal information
- Born: August 29, 1956 (age 70); New Castle, Pennsylvania, U.S.
- Listed height: 6 ft 2 in (1.88 m)
- Listed weight: 250 lb (113 kg)

Career information
- High school: Neshannock Township
- College: University of Pittsburgh
- NFL draft: 1978: 11th round, 300th overall pick

Career history
- 1974–1977: Pittsburgh Panthers

Awards and highlights
- National champion (1976); Consensus All-American (1977); Second-team All-American (1976); 2× First-team All-East (1976, 1977); Second-team All-East (1975)

Thomas Francis Brzoza (born August 29, 1956) is an American former football player. He played college football at the center and guard positions for the University of Pittsburgh from 1974 to 1977. He was a consensus first-team center on the 1977 College Football All-America Team. He was selected 300th overall by the Pittsburgh Steelers in the 11th round of the 1978 NFL draft, but he was injured and released in August 1978. Brzoza hired an attorney and made a claim that the practice session in which he was injured violated NFL off-season regulations against conducting practices with shoulder pads; he reached a settlement with the Steelers in March 1979.
