= Elliott Walker =

American football player (born 1956)

No. 35
- Position: Running back

Personal information
- Born: September 10, 1956 (age 70); Indianola, Mississippi, U.S.
- Listed height: 5 ft 11 in (1.80 m)
- Listed weight: 193 lb (88 kg)

Career information
- High school: Miami Jackson (Miami, Florida)
- College: Pittsburgh
- NFL draft: 1978: 6th round, 148th overall pick

Career history
- San Francisco 49ers (1978)

Awards and highlights
- National champion (1976); First-team All-East (1977)

Career NFL statistics
- Games played: 9
- Stats at Pro Football Reference

Elliot Walker (born September 10, 1956) is an American former professional football player who was a running back for the San Francisco 49ers of the National Football League (NFL). He played college football for the Pittsburgh Panthers. He also played in the Canadian Football League (CFL) for the Toronto Argonauts.
