= Willie Taylor (American football) =

American football player (born 1955)

No. 89
- Position: Wide receiver

Personal information
- Born: December 9, 1955 (age 70); Montclair, New Jersey, U.S.
- Listed height: 6 ft 1 in (1.85 m)
- Listed weight: 179 lb (81 kg)

Career information
- High school: Verona (Verona, New Jersey)
- College: Pittsburgh
- NFL draft: 1978: 9th round, 223rd overall pick

Career history
- Green Bay Packers (1978)

Awards and highlights
- National champion (1976)

Career NFL statistics
- Games played: 1
- Stats at Pro Football Reference

Willis T. Taylor (born December 9, 1955) is an American former professional football player who was a wide receiver in the National Football League (NFL). After playing college football for the Pittsburgh Panthers, he was selected by the Tampa Bay Buccaneers in the ninth round of the 1978 NFL draft, and was a member of the Green Bay Packers that season.
