= Al Chesley =

American football player (born 1957)

No. 59, 57
- Position: Linebacker

Personal information
- Born: August 23, 1957 (age 69); Washington, D.C., U.S.
- Listed height: 6 ft 3 in (1.91 m)
- Listed weight: 240 lb (109 kg)

Career information
- High school: Eastern (Washington, D.C.)
- College: Pittsburgh
- NFL draft: 1979: 11th round, 296th overall pick

Career history
- Philadelphia Eagles (1979–1982); Chicago Bears (1982)

Awards and highlights
- National champion (1976); First-team All-East (1978); Second-team All-East (1977)

Career NFL statistics
- Interceptions: 4
- Sacks: 2.5
- Fumble recoveries: 3
- Stats at Pro Football Reference

Albert Cornell Chesley (born August 23, 1957) is an American former professional football player who was a linebacker in the National Football League (NFL). He played college football for the Pittsburgh Panthers. Chesley is listed as the starting linebacker on the National Champion 1976 Pitt Panther squad. He was selected by the Philadelphia Eagles in the 11th round of the 1979 NFL draft.

Chesley was the Eagles starting inside linebacker in 1981, making 16 starts and recording two interceptions to go along with two fumble recoveries. He also had 133 tackles in 1981, but Philadelphia changed up their defensive scheme in 1982 with Chesley losing his starting spot. All told, Chesley played in 48 games while in Philadelphia. Chesley also was a member of the Chicago Bears.

After years of silence, Chesley came forward as a victim of sexual abuse as a child, at the hands of a neighborhood police officer. He was among a group of 200 men who appeared on an episode of The Oprah Winfrey Show holding pictures of themselves at the age when they began to suffer the abuse.

Chesley is the brother of fellow NFL players Frank Chesley and John Chesley.
