= 1976 Pittsburgh Panthers football team =

American college football season

1976 Pittsburgh Panthers football

Consensus national champion Sugar Bowl champion Eastern champion

Sugar Bowl, W 27–3 vs. Georgia
- Conference: Independent

Ranking
- Coaches: No. 1
- AP: No. 1
- Record: 12–0
- Head coach: Johnny Majors (4th season)
- Offensive coordinator: Joe Avezzano (1st season)
- Offensive scheme: Veer
- Defensive coordinator: Bobby Roper (1st season)
- Base defense: Basic 50
- Home stadium: Pitt Stadium

1976 NCAA Division I independents football records
	Conf.			Overall
Team	W	L	T	W		L		T
No. 1 Pittsburgh		–		12	–	0	–	0
No. 17 Rutgers		–		11	–	0	–	0
San Diego State		–		10	–	1	–	0
No. 12 Notre Dame		–		9	–	3	–	0
Colgate		–		8	–	2	–	0
Boston College		–		8	–	3	–	0
Cincinnati		–		8	–	3	–	0
Memphis State		–		7	–	4	–	0
North Texas State *		–		7	–	4	–	0
Southern Illinois		–		7	–	4	–	0
Penn State		–		7	–	5	–	0
Villanova		–		6	–	4	–	1
South Carolina		–		6	–	5	–	0
Virginia Tech		–		6	–	5	–	0
Army		–		5	–	6	–	0
Florida State		–		5	–	6	–	0
Illinois State		–		5	–	6	–	0
Richmond		–		5	–	6	–	0
West Virginia		–		5	–	6	–	0
Georgia Tech		–		4	–	6	–	1
Temple		–		4	–	6	–	0
Air Force		–		4	–	7	–	0
Dayton		–		4	–	7	–	0
Louisville		–		4	–	7	–	0
Marshall		–		4	–	7	–	0
Navy		–		4	–	7	–	0
Indiana State		–		3	–	7	–	0
Hawaii		–		3	–	8	–	0
Holy Cross		–		3	–	8	–	0
Miami (FL)		–		3	–	8	–	0
Syracuse		–		3	–	8	–	0
Utah State		–		3	–	8	–	0
Northeast Louisiana		–		2	–	9	–	0
Southern Miss		–		2	–	9	–	0
Tulane		–		2	–	9	–	0
North Texas State (originally 6–5) was awarded a forfeit win after Mississippi State was found to be using an ineligible player.; Rankings from AP Poll

The 1976 Pittsburgh Panthers football team represented the University of Pittsburgh as an independent during the 1976 NCAA Division I football season and is recognized as a consensus national champion. Pitt was also awarded the Lambert-Meadowlands Trophy as the best Division I team in the East. The Panthers played their home games at Pitt Stadium in Pittsburgh, Pennsylvania.

During the 1970s, the top-ranked team won its bowl game only three times: Pittsburgh joined Nebraska (1971) and USC (1972).

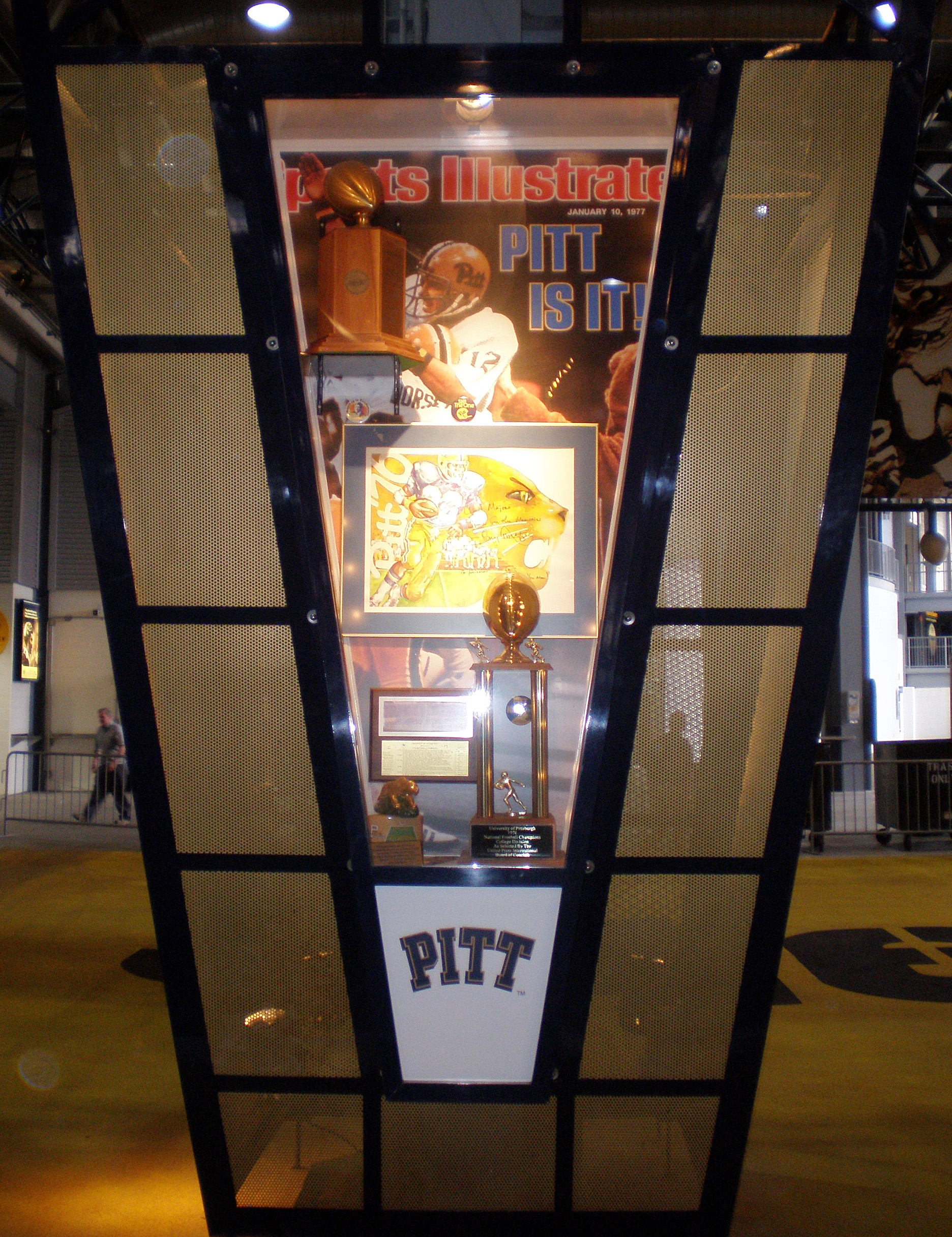
Kiosk in the Great Hall at Heinz Field celebrating Pitt's 1976 national championship

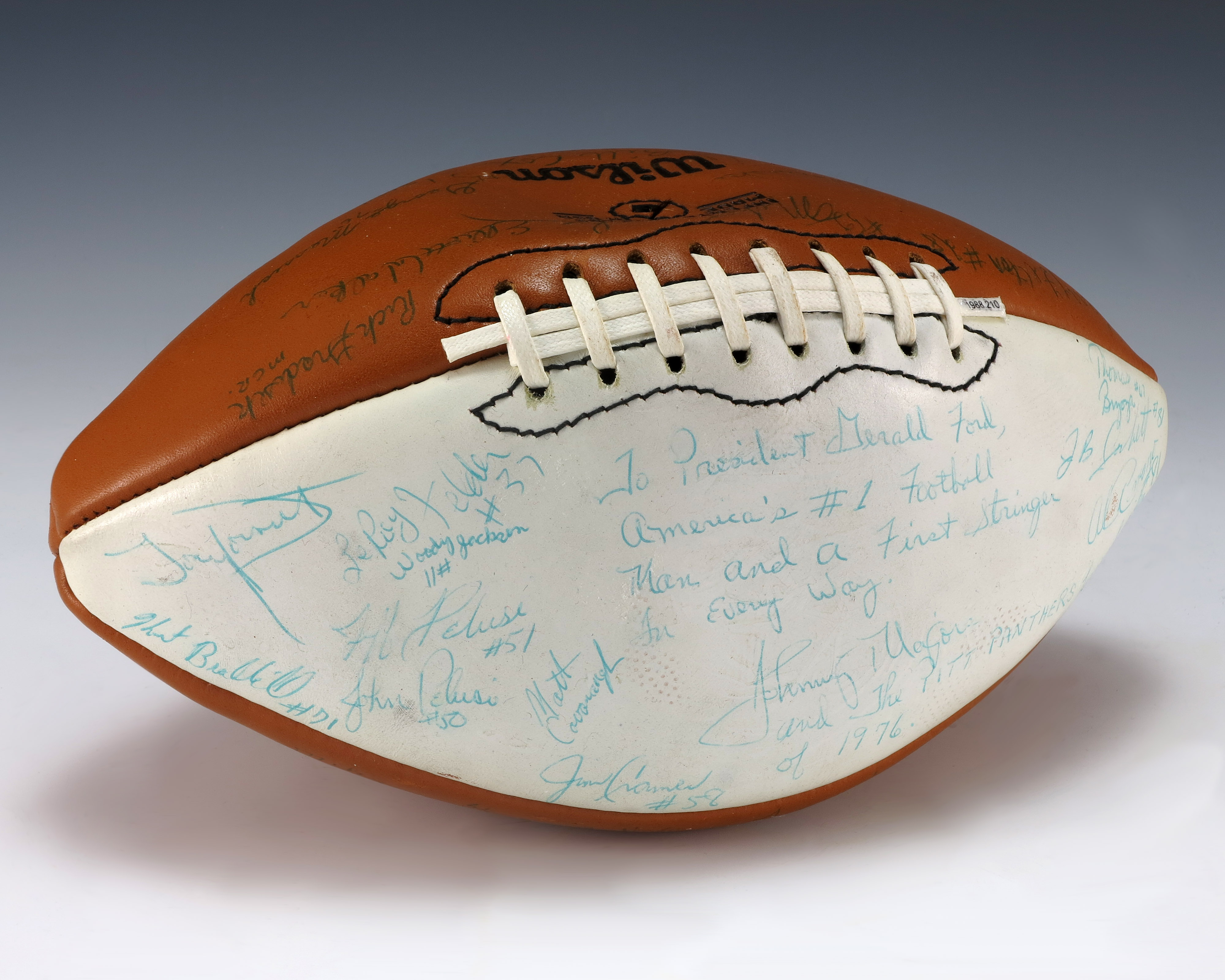
A football signed by the 1976 Pittsburgh Panthers football team, including Tony Dorsett and head coach Johnny Majors.

In the first game of the 1976 season, the Panthers faced off against Notre Dame in South Bend, Indiana. A year earlier, Tony Dorsett had finished with 303 yards rushing in Pitt's 34–20 victory over the Irish. "They even grew the grass high," said Carmen DeArdo, a diehard Pitt alumnus, "and everyone knew Tony would get the ball." "They didn't let that grass grow long enough," Dorsett said later. He darted 61 yards on his first run of the season and tacked on 120 more by the end of the 31–10 Pitt win.

The season continued with a 42–14 win at Georgia Tech and a 36–19 win over Miami. The Panthers traveled to Annapolis on October 23 to face Navy and Dorsett broke the NCAA career rushing record on a 32-yard touchdown run in the 45–0 victory. Dorsett's achievement prompted a mid-game celebration in which even Navy saluted the feat with a cannon blast. Pitt won a tough, hard-fought battle against struggling rival Syracuse.

On November 6, the second-ranked Panthers hosted Army at Pitt Stadium and won handily, but the significant action was taking place several hundred miles west, in West Lafayette, Indiana, where the Purdue Boilermakers held off the top-ranked Michigan Wolverines 16–14 in the closing seconds. The Pitt Stadium crowd erupted in celebration when the stadium public address announcer dramatically gave the final score from Purdue. For the first time in the modern era, Panther fans could legitimately claim, "We're number one!" Pitt defended its ranking in a close Backyard Brawl against West Virginia to go 10–0 heading into the regular season finale on national television against instate rival Penn State (7–3).

At a packed Three Rivers Stadium on the night after Thanksgiving, the Nittany Lions scored first and held Dorsett to 51 yards in the first half; the game was tied at seven at halftime. Majors adjusted for the second half by shifting Dorsett from tailback to fullback, enabling him to explode for an additional 173 yards as Pitt rolled to a 24–7 victory to cap an undefeated regular season.

In December, Dorsett became the first (and remains the only) Pitt Panther to win the Heisman Trophy as the nation's best college football player. Dorsett also won the Maxwell Award, the Walter Camp Player of the Year Award, and was named UPI Player of the Year. He led the nation in rushing with 1,948 yards and was selected as an All-American. Dorsett finished his college career with 6,082 total rushing yards, then an NCAA record for career rushing.

== Schedule ==
Date	Time	Opponent	Rank	Site	TV	Result	Attendance	Source
September 11	4:20 pm	at No. 11 Notre Dame	No. 9	Notre Dame Stadium; Notre Dame, IN (rivalry)	ABC	W 31–10	59,075	
September 18	7:30 pm	at Georgia Tech	No. 3	Grant Field; Atlanta, GA		W 42–14	43,424	
September 25	1:30 pm	Temple	No. 3	Pitt Stadium; Pittsburgh, PA		W 21–7	38,500	
October 2	1:30 pm	at Duke	No. 2	Wallace Wade Stadium; Durham, NC		W 44–31	37,200	
October 9	1:30 pm	Louisville	No. 2	Pitt Stadium; Pittsburgh, PA		W 27–6	34,000	
October 16	1:30 pm	Miami (FL)	No. 2	Pitt Stadium; Pittsburgh, PA		W 36–19	42,434	
October 23	2:00 pm	at Navy	No. 2	Navy–Marine Corps Memorial Stadium; Annapolis, MD		W 45–0	26,346	
October 30	1:30 pm	Syracuse	No. 2	Pitt Stadium; Pittsburgh, PA (rivalry)		W 23–13	50,399	
November 6	1:30 pm	Army^{†}	No. 2	Pitt Stadium; Pittsburgh, PA		W 37–7	45,753	
November 13	12:30 pm	West Virginia	No. 1	Pitt Stadium; Pittsburgh, PA (Backyard Brawl)	ABC	W 24–16	56,500	
November 26	9:00 pm	No. 16 Penn State	No. 1	Three Rivers Stadium; Pittsburgh, PA (rivalry)	ABC	W 24–7	50,250	
January 1	12:30 pm	vs. No. 5 Georgia	No. 1	Louisiana Superdome; New Orleans, LA (Sugar Bowl)	ABC	W 27–3	76,117	
^{†}Homecoming; Rankings from AP Poll released prior to the game; All times are in Eastern time

== Rankings ==
=== AP Poll ===
Pre	1	2	3	4	5	6	7	8	9	10	11	12	13	Final
9	3	3	2	2	2	2	2	2	1	1	1	1	1	1

=== UPI Poll ===
1	2	3	4	5	6	7	8	9	10	11	12	13	Final
4	3	3	2	2	2	2	2	1	1	1	1	1	1

== Game summaries ==
=== at No. 11 Notre Dame ===
Game One – No. 9 Pittsburgh Panthers (0–0) at No. 11 Notre Dame Fighting Irish (0–0) – Game summary

Quarter	1	2	3	4	Total
No. 9 Panthers	7	14	0	10	31
No. 11 Fighting Irish	7	3	0	0	10

at Notre Dame Stadium • Notre Dame, Indiana

- Date: September 11, 1976
- Game time: 4:20 p.m. EDT
- Game attendance: 59,075
- Referee: Tom Paspalas
- TV announcers (ABC): Keith Jackson (play-by-play), Ara Parseghian (color commentator), Bill Flemming (sideline) and Jim Lampley (sideline)

Statistics	PITT	ND
First downs	12	20
Total yards	277	287
Rushes/yards	53–191	50–112
Passing yards	87	175
Passing: Comp–Att–Int	6–13–0	13–38–4
Time of possession		

Team	Category	Player	Statistics
Pittsburgh	Passing	Robert Haygood	5–12, 83 yards
Pittsburgh	Rushing	Tony Dorsett	22 carries, 181 yards, 1 TD
Pittsburgh	Receiving	Jim Corbett	4 receptions, 72 yards
Notre Dame	Passing		
Notre Dame	Rushing		
Notre Dame	Receiving		

Scoring summary

Quarter	Time	Drive			Team	Scoring information	Score	
Quarter	Time	Plays	Yards	TOP	Team	Scoring information	Pittsburgh	Notre Dame
1					Notre Dame	McAfee 25-yard touchdown reception from Siager, Reeve kick good	0	7
1					Pittsburgh	Dorsett 5-yard touchdown run, Long kick good	7	7
2					Pittsburgh	Haygood 1-yard touchdown run, Long kick good	14	7
2					Pittsburgh	Haygood 1-yard touchdown run, Long kick good	21	7
2					Notre Dame	53-yard field goal by Siager	21	10
4					Pittsburgh	34-yard field goal by Long	24	10
4					Pittsburgh	Cavanaugh 8-yard touchdown run, Long kick good	31	10
"TOP" = time of possession. For other American football terms, see Glossary of American football.							31	10

=== at Georgia Tech ===
Robert Haygood tore knee ligaments in the victory.

Game Two – No. 3 Pittsburgh Panthers (1–0) at Georgia Tech Yellow Jackets (0–1) – Game summary

Quarter	1	2	3	4	Total
No. 3 Panthers	7	7	14	14	42
Yellow Jackets	0	7	7	0	14

at Grant Field • Atlanta, Georgia

- Date: September 18, 1976
- Game time: 7:30 p.m. EDT
- Game attendance: 43,424

Statistics	PITT	GT
First downs		
Total yards		
Rushes/yards		
Passing yards		
Passing: Comp–Att–Int		
Time of possession		

Team	Category	Player	Statistics
Pittsburgh	Passing		
Pittsburgh	Rushing	Tony Dorsett	27 carries, 113 yards, 3 TD
Pittsburgh	Receiving		
Georgia Tech	Passing		
Georgia Tech	Rushing		
Georgia Tech	Receiving		

Scoring summary

Quarter	Time	Drive			Team	Scoring information	Score	
Quarter	Time	Plays	Yards	TOP	Team	Scoring information	Pittsburgh	Georgia Tech
1					Pittsburgh	Dorsett 6-yard touchdown run, Long kick good	7	0
2					Pittsburgh	Dorsett 6-yard touchdown run, Long kick good	14	0
2					Georgia Tech	Jolly 1-yard touchdown run, Smith kick good	14	7
3					Pittsburgh	Cavanaugh 4-yard touchdown run, Long kick good	21	7
3					Georgia Tech	Rucker 1-yard touchdown run, Smith kick good	21	14
3					Pittsburgh	Jones 51-yard touchdown reception from Haygood, Long kick good	28	14
4					Pittsburgh	Dorsett 10-yard touchdown run, Long kick good	35	14
4					Pittsburgh	Jones 6-yard touchdown reception from Cavanaugh, Long kick good	42	14
"TOP" = time of possession. For other American football terms, see Glossary of American football.							42	14

=== Temple ===
Game Three – Temple Owls (2–0) at No. 3 Pittsburgh Panthers (2–0) – Game summary

Quarter	1	2	3	4	Total
Owls	7	0	0	0	7
No. 3 Panthers	0	6	8	7	21

at Pitt Stadium • Pittsburgh, PA

- Date: September 25, 1976
- Game time: 1:30 p.m. EDT
- Game attendance: 38,500

Statistics	TU	PITT
First downs		
Total yards		
Rushes/yards		
Passing yards		
Passing: Comp–Att–Int		
Time of possession		

Team	Category	Player	Statistics
Temple	Passing		
Temple	Rushing		
Temple	Receiving		
Pittsburgh	Passing		
Pittsburgh	Rushing		
Pittsburgh	Receiving		

Scoring summary

Quarter	Time	Drive			Team	Scoring information	Score	
Quarter	Time	Plays	Yards	TOP	Team	Scoring information	Temple	Pittsburgh
1		–	–	–	Temple	Johnson recovered blocked punt and returned 15 yards for a touchdown, Sornisky kick good	7	0
2					Pittsburgh	50-yard field goal by Long	7	3
2					Pittsburgh	33-yard field goal by Long	7	6
3					Pittsburgh	Walker 1-yard touchdown run, 2-point run good	7	14
4					Pittsburgh	Dorsett 3-yard touchdown run, Long kick good	7	21
"TOP" = time of possession. For other American football terms, see Glossary of American football.							7	21

=== at Duke ===
Game Four – No. 2 Pittsburgh Panthers (3–0) at Duke Blue Devils (2–1) – Game summary

Quarter	1	2	3	4	Total
No. 2 Panthers	7	23	14	0	44
Blue Devils	7	0	16	8	31

at Wallace Wade Stadium • Durham, NC

- Date: October 2, 1976
- Game time: 1:30 p.m. EDT
- Game attendance: 37,200

Statistics	PITT	DUKE
First downs		
Total yards		
Rushes/yards		
Passing yards		
Passing: Comp–Att–Int		
Time of possession		

Team	Category	Player	Statistics
Pittsburgh	Passing		
Pittsburgh	Rushing		
Pittsburgh	Receiving		
Duke	Passing		
Duke	Rushing		
Duke	Receiving		

Scoring summary

Quarter	Time	Drive			Team	Scoring information	Score	
Quarter	Time	Plays	Yards	TOP	Team	Scoring information	Pittsburgh	Duke
1					Duke	Gore 4-yard touchdown run, Fusco kick good	0	7
1					Pittsburgh	Taylor 66-yard touchdown reception from Cavanaugh, Long kick good	7	7
2		–	–	–	Pittsburgh	Safety, blocked punt goes out of the end zone.	9	7
2					Pittsburgh	Taylor 10-yard touchdown reception from Cavanaugh, Long kick good	16	7
2					Pittsburgh	Corbett 27-yard touchdown reception from Cavanaugh, Long kick good	23	7
2					Pittsburgh	Jones 37-yard touchdown reception from Cavanaugh, Long kick good	30	7
3					Pittsburgh	Jones 27-yard touchdown reception from Cavanaugh, Long kick good	37	7
3					Duke	Barney 1-yard touchdown run, 2-point pass good	37	15
3					Pittsburgh	Dorsett 4-yard touchdown run, Long kick good	44	15
3					Duke	Williamson 55-yard touchdown reception from Dunn, 2-point pass good	44	23
4					Duke	Gore 1-yard touchdown run, 2-point run good	44	31
"TOP" = time of possession. For other American football terms, see Glossary of American football.							44	31

=== Louisville ===
Game Five – Louisville Cardinals (2–1) at No. 2 Pittsburgh Panthers (4–0) – Game summary

Quarter	1	2	3	4	Total
Cardinals	0	0	0	6	6
No. 2 Panthers	10	17	0	0	27

at Pitt Stadium • Pittsburgh, Pennsylvania

- Date: October 9, 1976
- Game time: 1:30 p.m. EDT
- Game attendance: 34,000

Statistics	LOU	PITT
First downs		
Total yards		
Rushes/yards		
Passing yards		
Passing: Comp–Att–Int		
Time of possession		

Team	Category	Player	Statistics
Louisville	Passing		
Louisville	Rushing		
Louisville	Receiving		
Pittsburgh	Passing		
Pittsburgh	Rushing	Tony Dorsett	30 carries, 130 yards
Pittsburgh	Receiving		

Scoring summary

Quarter	Time	Drive			Team	Scoring information	Score	
Quarter	Time	Plays	Yards	TOP	Team	Scoring information	Louisville	Pittsburgh
1	10:21				Pittsburgh	Cavanaugh 17-yard touchdown run, Long kick good	0	7
1					Pittsburgh	39-yard field goal by Long	0	10
2	10:49		52		Pittsburgh	Cavanaugh 6-yard touchdown run, Long kick good	0	17
2		–	–	–	Pittsburgh	Fumble recovery returned 0 yards for touchdown by Johnson, Long kick good	0	24
2					Pittsburgh	30-yard field goal by Long	0	27
4		–	–	–	Louisville	Fumble recovery returned 0 yards for touchdown by Abood, Turner kick no good	6	27
"TOP" = time of possession. For other American football terms, see Glossary of American football.							6	27

Matt Cavanaugh sustained a hairline fracture in the left ankle during the first half.

=== Miami (FL) ===
Game Six – Miami (FL) Hurricanes (1–4) at No. 2 Pittsburgh Panthers (5–0) – Game summary

Quarter	1	2	3	4	Total
Hurricanes	0	0	6	13	19
No. 2 Panthers	9	13	0	14	36

at Pitt Stadium • Pittsburgh, PA

- Date: October 16, 1976
- Game time: 1:30 p.m. EDT
- Game attendance: 42,434

Statistics	MIAMI	PITT
First downs		
Total yards		
Rushes/yards		
Passing yards		
Passing: Comp–Att–Int		
Time of possession		

Team	Category	Player	Statistics
Miami (FL)	Passing		
Miami (FL)	Rushing		
Miami (FL)	Receiving		
Pittsburgh	Passing		
Pittsburgh	Rushing	Tony Dorsett	35 carries, 227 yards, TD
Pittsburgh	Receiving	Tony Dorsett	1 reception, 40 yards, TD

Scoring summary

Quarter	Time	Drive			Team	Scoring information	Score	
Quarter	Time	Plays	Yards	TOP	Team	Scoring information	Miami (FL)	Pittsburgh
1		–	–	–	Pittsburgh	Safety, Felder tackled Mason in end zone.	0	2
1					Pittsburgh	Dorsett 3-yard touchdown run, Long kick good	0	9
2					Pittsburgh	25-yard field goal by Long	0	12
2					Pittsburgh	29-yard field goal by Long	0	15
2					Pittsburgh	Dorsett 40-yard touchdown reception from Yawcic, Long kick good	0	22
3					Miami (FL)	Johnson 3-yard touchdown run, 2-point run failed	6	22
4					Pittsburgh	Taylor 10-yard touchdown run, Long kick good	6	29
4					Miami (FL)	Cain 75-yard touchdown reception from Glover, 2-point pass incomplete	12	29
4					Pittsburgh	Dorsett 53-yard touchdown run, Long kick good	12	36
4					Miami (FL)	Anderson 2-yard touchdown run, Dennis kick good	19	36
"TOP" = time of possession. For other American football terms, see Glossary of American football.							19	36

=== at Navy ===
Game Seven – No. 2 Pittsburgh Panthers (6–0) at Navy Midshipmen (1–5) – Game summary

Quarter	1	2	3	4	Total
No. 2 Panthers	7	7	10	21	45
Midshipmen	0	0	0	0	0

at Navy–Marine Corps Memorial Stadium, Annapolis, Maryland

- Date: October 23, 1976
- Game time: 2:00 p.m. EDT
- Game attendance: 26,346

Statistics	PITT	NAVY
First downs		
Total yards		
Rushes/yards		
Passing yards		
Passing: Comp–Att–Int		
Time of possession		

Team	Category	Player	Statistics
Pittsburgh	Passing		
Pittsburgh	Rushing	Tony Dorsett	27 carries, 180 yards, 3 TD
Pittsburgh	Receiving		
Navy	Passing		
Navy	Rushing		
Navy	Receiving		

Scoring summary

Quarter	Time	Drive			Team	Scoring information	Score	
Quarter	Time	Plays	Yards	TOP	Team	Scoring information	Pittsburgh	Navy
1					Pittsburgh	Corbett 30-yard touchdown reception from Yawcic, Long kick good	7	0
2					Pittsburgh	Dorsett 6-yard touchdown run, Long kick good	14	0
3					Pittsburgh	40-yard field goal by Long	17	0
3					Pittsburgh	Dorsett 69-yard touchdown run, Long kick good	24	0
4					Pittsburgh	Dorsett 21-yard touchdown run, Long kick good	31	0
4					Pittsburgh	Dorsett 32-yard touchdown run, Long kick good	38	0
4					Pittsburgh	Sindewald 18-yard touchdown run, Long kick good	45	0
"TOP" = time of possession. For other American football terms, see Glossary of American football.							45	0

=== Syracuse ===
Game Eight – Syracuse Orangemen (3–4) at No. 2 Pittsburgh Panthers (7–0) – Game summary

Quarter	1	2	3	4	Total
Orangemen	7	0	6	0	13
No. 2 Panthers	3	7	7	6	23

at Pitt Stadium • Pittsburgh, PA

- Date: October 30, 1976
- Game time: 1:30 p.m. EDT
- Game attendance: 50,399

Statistics	SYR	PITT
First downs		
Total yards		
Rushes/yards		
Passing yards		
Passing: Comp–Att–Int		
Time of possession		

Team	Category	Player	Statistics
Syracuse	Passing		
Syracuse	Rushing		
Syracuse	Receiving		
Pittsburgh	Passing		
Pittsburgh	Rushing		
Pittsburgh	Receiving		

Scoring summary

Quarter	Time	Drive			Team	Scoring information	Score	
Quarter	Time	Plays	Yards	TOP	Team	Scoring information	Syracuse	Pittsburgh
1					Pittsburgh	41-yard field goal by Long	0	3
1					Syracuse	Magee 80-yard touchdown reception from Hurley, Jacobs kick good	7	3
2					Pittsburgh	Dorsett 1-yard touchdown run, Long kick good	7	10
3					Syracuse	45-yard field goal by Jacobs	10	10
3					Syracuse	55-yard field goal by Jacobs	13	10
3					Pittsburgh	Dorsett 33-yard touchdown run, Long kick good	13	17
4					Pittsburgh	47-yard field goal by Long	13	20
4					Pittsburgh	29-yard field goal by Long	13	23
"TOP" = time of possession. For other American football terms, see Glossary of American football.							13	23

=== Army ===
Game Nine – Army Cadets (4–4) at No. 2 Pittsburgh Panthers (8–0) – Game summary

Quarter	1	2	3	4	Total
Cadets	0	0	7	0	7
No. 2 Panthers	3	10	21	3	37

at Pitt Stadium • Pittsburgh, PA

- Date: November 6, 1976
- Game time: 1:30 p.m. EST
- Game attendance: 45,753

Statistics	ARMY	PITT
First downs		
Total yards		
Rushes/yards		
Passing yards		
Passing: Comp–Att–Int		
Time of possession		

Team	Category	Player	Statistics
Army	Passing		
Army	Rushing		
Army	Receiving		
Pittsburgh	Passing		
Pittsburgh	Rushing		
Pittsburgh	Receiving		

Scoring summary

Quarter	Time	Drive			Team	Scoring information	Score	
Quarter	Time	Plays	Yards	TOP	Team	Scoring information	Army	Pittsburgh
1					Pittsburgh	27-yard field goal by Long	0	3
2					Pittsburgh	39-yard field goal by Long	0	6
2					Pittsburgh	Dorsett 4-yard touchdown run, Long kick good	0	13
3					Pittsburgh	Dorsett 32-yard touchdown run, Long kick good	0	20
3					Pittsburgh	Dorsett 5-yard touchdown run, Long kick good	0	27
3					Army	Logue 27-yard touchdown reception from Hall, Castelli kick good	7	27
4					Pittsburgh	Taylor 24-yard touchdown reception from Cavanaugh, Long kick good	7	34
4					Pittsburgh	35-yard field goal by Long	7	37
"TOP" = time of possession. For other American football terms, see Glossary of American football.							7	37

=== West Virginia ===
Game Ten – West Virginia Mountaineers (4–6) at No. 1 Pittsburgh Panthers (9–0) – Game summary

Quarter	1	2	3	4	Total
Mountaineers	3	0	7	6	16
No. 1 Panthers	7	7	3	7	24

at Pitt Stadium • Pittsburgh, PA

- Date: November 13, 1976
- Game time: 12:30 p.m. EST
- Game attendance: 56,500
- Referee: Raymond Bower
- TV announcers (ABC): Steve Zabriskie (play-by-play) and Lee Grosscup (color commentator)

Statistics	WVU	PITT
First downs	15	25
Total yards	169	399
Rushes/yards	44–99	63–350
Passing yards	70	49
Passing: Comp–Att–Int	8–24–1	8–14–0
Time of possession		

Team	Category	Player	Statistics
West Virginia	Passing	Dan Kendra	8–24, 70 yards, 2 TD, 1 INT
West Virginia	Rushing	Walt Easley	16 carries, 75 yards
West Virginia	Receiving	Steve Lewis	6 receptions, 74 yards, 2 TD
Pittsburgh	Passing	Matt Cavanaugh	8–14, 49 yards
Pittsburgh	Rushing	Tony Dorsett	38 carries, 199 yards, 3 TD
Pittsburgh	Receiving	Jim Corbett	4 receptions, 27 yards

Scoring summary

Quarter	Time	Drive			Team	Scoring information	Score	
Quarter	Time	Plays	Yards	TOP	Team	Scoring information	West Virginia	Pittsburgh
1	7:33				Pittsburgh	Dorsett 17-yard touchdown run, Long kick good	0	7
1	0:50				West Virginia	22-yard field goal by McKenzie	3	7
2	12:32				Pittsburgh	Dorsett 3-yard touchdown run, Long kick good	3	14
3	11:41				Pittsburgh	27-yard field goal by Long	3	17
3	4:03				West Virginia	Lewis 14-yard touchdown reception from Kendra, McKenzie kick good	10	17
4	9:05				Pittsburgh	Dorsett 30-yard touchdown run, Long kick good	10	24
4	3:11				West Virginia	Lewis 9-yard touchdown reception from Kendra, McKenzie kick no good	16	24
"TOP" = time of possession. For other American football terms, see Glossary of American football.							16	24

=== vs. No. 16 Penn State ===
Game Eleven – No. 1 Pittsburgh Panthers (10–0) vs. No. 16 Penn State Nittany Lions (7–3) – Game summary

Quarter	1	2	3	4	Total
No. 1 Panthers	0	7	7	10	24
No. 16 Nittany Lions	7	0	0	0	7

at Three Rivers Stadium • Pittsburgh, PA

- Date: November 26, 1976
- Game time: 9:00 p.m. EST
- Game attendance: 50,250
- Referee: Paul Bertha
- TV announcers (ABC): Chris Schenkel (play-by-play), Bud Wilkinson (color commentator) and Steve Zabriskie (sideline reporter)

Statistics	PITT	PSU
First downs	20	12
Total yards	419	241
Rushes/yards	65–278	41–106
Passing yards	141	135
Passing: Comp–Att–Int	8–17–2	9–19–4
Time of possession		

Team	Category	Player	Statistics
Pittsburgh	Passing	Matt Cavanaugh	8–16, 141 yards, 2 INT
Pittsburgh	Rushing	Tony Dorsett	38 carries, 224 yards, 2 TD
Pittsburgh	Receiving	Gordon Jones	4 receptions, 111 yards
Penn State	Passing		
Penn State	Rushing		
Penn State	Receiving		

Scoring summary

Quarter	Time	Drive			Team	Scoring information	Score	
Quarter	Time	Plays	Yards	TOP	Team	Scoring information	Pittsburgh	Penn State
1	11:59				Penn State	Torrey 21-yard touchdown reception from Fusina, Capozzoli kick good	0	7
2	7:42				Pittsburgh	Dorsett 6-yard touchdown run, Long kick good	7	7
3	13:23				Pittsburgh	Dorsett 40-yard touchdown run, Long kick good	14	7
4	10:55				Pittsburgh	Walker 12-yard touchdown run, Long kick good	21	7
4	3:10				Pittsburgh	47-yard field goal by Long	24	7
"TOP" = time of possession. For other American football terms, see Glossary of American football.							24	7

=== vs. No. 5 Georgia (Sugar Bowl) ===
The 11–0 Panthers accepted an invitation to the Sugar Bowl to face fifth-ranked Georgia. Pitt defeated the Bulldogs 27–3 and was voted number one by both the Associated Press and Coaches polls, claiming their ninth national championship. This was Pitt's first undefeated national championship since 1937. The American Football Coaches Association (AFCA) named Majors the 1976 Coach of the Year. Following this historic season, Majors returned to his alma mater, the University of Tennessee, to take the head coaching job.

1977 Sugar Bowl
No. 1 Pittsburgh Panthers (11–0) vs. No. 5 Georgia Bulldogs (10–1) – Game summary

Quarter	1	2	3	4	Total
No. 1 Panthers	7	14	3	3	27
No. 5 Bulldogs	0	0	3	0	3

at Louisiana Superdome • New Orleans, LA

- Date: January 1, 1977
- Game time: 12:30 p.m. EST
- Game weather: Indoor
- Game attendance: 76,177
- Referee: Vincent Buckley
- TV announcers (ABC): Keith Jackson (play-by-play), Ara Parseghian (color commentator) and Jim Lampley (sideline reporter)

Statistics	PITT	UGA
First downs	24	14
Total yards	480	181
Rushes/yards	66–288	40–135
Passing yards	192	46
Passing: Comp–Att–Int	10–18–0	3–22–4
Time of possession		

Team	Category	Player	Statistics
Pittsburgh	Passing	Matt Cavanaugh	10–18, 192 yards, 1 TD
Pittsburgh	Rushing	Tony Dorsett	32 carries, 202 yards, 1 TD
Pittsburgh	Receiving	Willie Taylor	4 receptions, 72 yards
Georgia	Passing		
Georgia	Rushing		
Georgia	Receiving		

Scoring summary

Quarter	Time	Drive			Team	Scoring information	Score	
Quarter	Time	Plays	Yards	TOP	Team	Scoring information	Pittsburgh	Georgia
1					Pittsburgh	Cavanaugh 6-yard touchdown run, Long kick good	7	0
2					Pittsburgh	Jones 59-yard touchdown reception from Cavanaugh, Long kick good	14	0
2					Pittsburgh	Dorsett 11-yard touchdown run, Long kick good	21	0
3					Georgia	25-yard field goal by Leavitt	21	3
3					Pittsburgh	42-yard field goal by Long	24	3
4					Pittsburgh	31-yard field goal by Long	27	3
"TOP" = time of possession. For other American football terms, see Glossary of American football.							27	3

Starting Lineups

Position	Starting Lineups vs. Georgia (Sugar Bowl)
Offense
SE	#24 Gordon Jones
LT	#64 John Hanhauser
LG	#77 Matt Carroll
C	#50 John Pelusi
RG	#67 Tom Brzoza
RT	#76 George Messich
TE	#81 James Corbett
QB	#12 Matt Cavanaugh
TB	#33 Tony Dorsett
FB	#44 Bob Hutton
FL	#29 Willie Taylor
Defense
LE	#80 Ed Wilamowski
LT	#68 Don Parrish
MG	#91 Al Romano
RT	#70 Randy Holloway
RE	#60 Cecil Johnson
LLB	#59 Arnie Weatherton
RLB	#58 James Cramer
MON	#14 Jeff Delaney
LHB	#21 J.C. Wilson
RHB	#37 LeRoy Felder
S	#31 Bob Jury

== Personnel ==
=== Coaching staff ===
1976 Pittsburgh Panthers football staff
Coaching staff: Johnny Majors – head coach; Joe Madden – assistant head coach/defensive secondary; Joe Avezzano – offensive coordinator/offensive line; Bobby Roper – defensive coordinator/defensive line; Bill Cox – quarterbacks/receivers; Jim Dyar – defensive secondary; Larry Holton – defensive ends; Harry Jones – offensive backs; Bob Matey – middle guards/junior varsity	Support staff: Henry Lee Parker – administrative assistant to the head coach; Keith Schroeder – coordinator of computer scouting; Ray Olsen – graduate assistant; Dave Wannstedt – graduate assistant	Strength and conditioning staff

=== Roster ===
1976 Pittsburgh Panthers football team roster
Players
Coaches
Offense

Pos.	#	Name	Class
C	67	Tom Brzoza	Jr
QB	12	Matt Cavanaugh	Jr
TE	81	James Corbett	Sr
RB	33	Tony Dorsett	Sr
RB		Jo Jo Heath	Fr
QB	10	Robert Haygood (injured)	Sr
LG	66	George Link	Jr
WR	24	Gordon Jones	So
WR	19	Randy Reutershan	Jr
WR	29	Willie Taylor	Jr
FB	34	Elliott Walker	Jr
QB		Tom Yewcic	Sr

Defense

Pos.	#	Name	Class
LB	55	Al Chesley	So
DT	75	Ed Gallagher	So
DE	70	Randy Holloway	Jr
DE	60	Cecil Johnson	Sr
CB	31	Bob Jury	Jr
DT	78	David Logan	So
DT	68	Don Parrish	Sr
DE	91	Al Romano	Sr
CB	21	J.C. Wilson	Jr

Special teams

Pos.	#	Name	Class
P	41	Larry Swider	Sr

Head coach

- Johnny Majors

Coordinators/assistant coaches

Legend

- (C) Team captain
- (S) Suspended
- (I) Ineligible
- Injured
- Redshirt

== Awards and honors ==
- Tony Dorsett, Heisman Trophy
- Tony Dorsett, Walter Camp Award
- Tony Dorsett, Maxwell Award
- Tony Dorsett, led the nation in rushing with 1,948 yards
- Tony Dorsett, All-America selection

== Team players drafted into the NFL ==
Player	Position	Round	Pick	NFL club
Tony Dorsett	Running back	1	2	Dallas Cowboys
Larry Swider	Punter	7	185	Denver Broncos
Jim Corbett	Tight end	7	194	Cincinnati Bengals
Al Romano	Defensive lineman	11	289	Houston Oilers
Carson Long	Kicker	11	302	Los Angeles Rams
Don Parrish	Defensive end	12	314	Atlanta Falcons

== Media ==
=== Radio ===
Flagship station	Play-by-play	Color commentator	Sideline reporter	Studio host
WTAE–AM 1250	Bill Hillgrove	John Sauer		

== Further information ==
- The Year the Panthers Roared. Francis J. Fitzgerald, ed., Louisville, Kentucky, AdCraft Sports, 1996, ISBN 1-887761-06-3
- 1976 team where are they now?
- Pitt Magazine article
