= Matt Cavanaugh =

American football player and coach (born 1956)

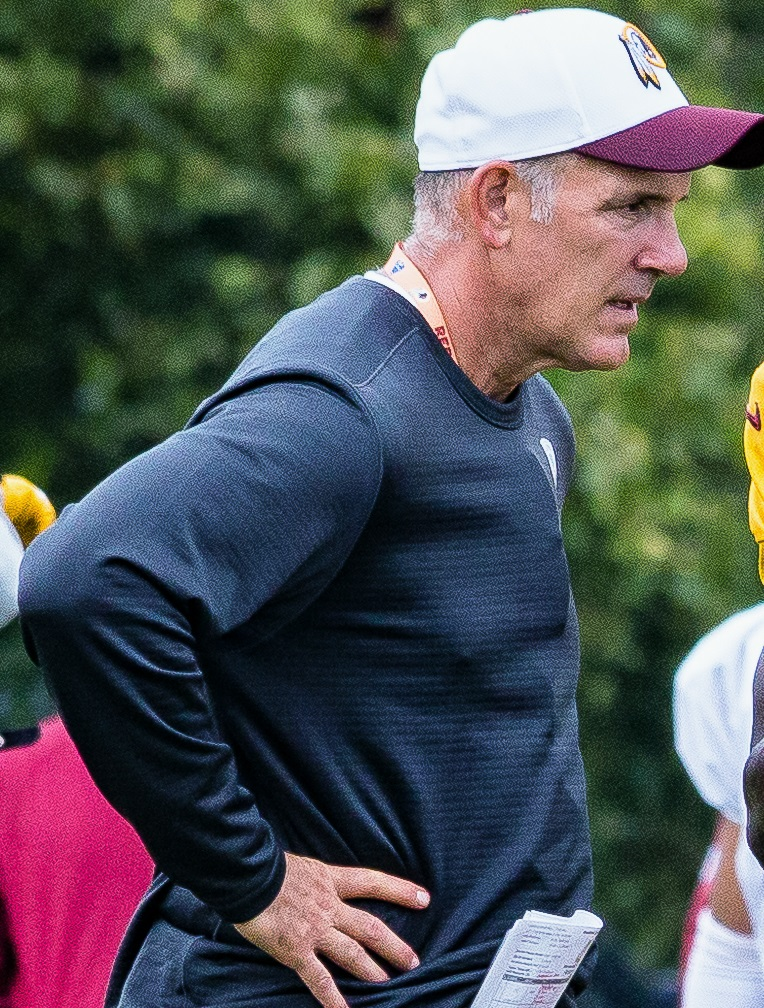
- Cavanaugh in 2015

Washington Huskies
- Title: Senior offensive assistant

Personal information
- Born: October 27, 1956 (age 70); Youngstown, Ohio, U.S.
- Listed height: 6 ft 2 in (1.88 m)
- Listed weight: 212 lb (96 kg)

Career information
- High school: Chaney (Youngstown)
- College: Pittsburgh (1974–1977)
- NFL draft: 1978: 2nd round, 50th overall pick

Career history

Playing
- New England Patriots (1978–1982); San Francisco 49ers (1983–1985); Philadelphia Eagles (1986–1989); New York Giants (1990–1991)

Coaching
- Pittsburgh (1992–1993) Tight ends coach; Arizona Cardinals (1994–1995) Quarterbacks coach; San Francisco 49ers (1996) Quarterbacks coach; Chicago Bears (1997–1998) Offensive coordinator; Baltimore Ravens (1999–2004) Offensive coordinator; Pittsburgh (2005–2008) Offensive coordinator; New York Jets (2009–2012) Quarterbacks coach; Chicago Bears (2013–2014) Quarterbacks coach; Washington Redskins (2015–2016) Quarterbacks coach; Washington Redskins (2017–2018) Offensive coordinator; Washington Redskins (2019) Senior offensive assistant; New York Jets (2021) Senior offensive assistant; Washington (2026–present) Senior offensive assistant

Awards and highlights
- As player: 2× Super Bowl champion (XIX, XXV); National champion (1976); First-team All-American (1977); First-team All-East (1977); Sugar Bowl MVP (1977); As coach: Super Bowl champion (XXXV)

Career NFL statistics
- Passing attempts: 579
- Passing completions: 305
- Completion percentage: 52.7%
- TD–INT: 28–30
- Passing yards: 4,332
- Passer rating: 71.7
- Stats at Pro Football Reference
- Coaching profile at Pro Football Reference

Matthew Andrew Cavanaugh (born October 27, 1956) is an American former professional football player and coach in the National Football League (NFL). He played as a quarterback, winning two Super Bowl titles. He played college football for the Pittsburgh Panthers. He is currently the senior offensive assistant at Washington.

After retiring from playing following the 1991 season, Cavanaugh worked as an offensive coach and offensive coordinator for teams including the San Francisco 49ers, Chicago Bears, Baltimore Ravens (where he earned a third ring as a coach), Washington Redskins (now the Washington Commanders), and New York Jets.

== Early life ==
Cavanaugh was born in Youngstown, Ohio, on October 27, 1956. He attended Chaney High School, and played quarterback on its 1973 and 1974 city championship teams, as team captain his senior year (1974). In 1988, he was inducted into the Chaney Athletic Hall of Fame.

== College football ==
He went on to the University of Pittsburgh after graduating, and is considered one of the greatest quarterbacks in school history. He played under College Football Hall of Fame head coach Johnny Majors (1974-1976) and head coach Jackie Sherrill (1977). In 1976, he was the starting quarterback for the undefeated Pittsburgh Panthers (he was on the same team with Heisman Trophy winner Tony Dorsett) and contributed to the team's National Championship 27–3 victory over Georgia in the Sugar Bowl. He scored the first touchdown in that game, and was on Sports Illustrated's January 10, 1977 cover being lifted in the air by Dorsett and another player after that touchdown. Cavanaugh was selected as the Sugar Bowl's Most Valuable Player (MVP), even though Dorsett had rushed for 202 yards, because of Cavanaugh’s commanding first half performance.

Cavanaugh was first team All-American his senior year (1977), and seventh in the Heisman Trophy voting. He was also named MVP of the 1977 Gator Bowl, throwing for 387 yards and four touchdown passes in a 34–3 win over Clemson.

In 1977, Cavanaugh missed playing time with a broken wrist, but the team still finished 9–2–1, and was ranked number 7 in the country. He still threw for 1,844 yards with 15 touchdowns against six interceptions (including regular season and Gator Bowl statistics). At that time, this was the second-most passing yards in Pittsburgh history for a season, only trailing quarterback Ken Lucas's 1,921 yards in 1965 (playing in 10 games that year). Cavanaugh’s 387 yards in the Gator Bowl was a Pitt single game record, and his 3,378 total passing yards for his career was second in school history. As of 2024, Cavanaugh is no longer in the top 10 in these categories for Pitt.

In 2023, he was inducted into the Pitt Athletics Hall of Fame.

== Professional football player ==
Cavanaugh was selected by the New England Patriots with the 50th overall pick in the second round of the 1978 NFL draft, but spent much of his career as a backup. His professional playing career included stints with the Patriots (1979-82), San Francisco 49ers (1983-85), Philadelphia Eagles (1986-89), and New York Giants (1990-91).

Cavanaugh was the backup quarterback in both the 1984 Super Bowl XIX and the 1990 Super Bowl XXV to Joe Montana and Jeff Hostetler, respectively. In the 1984 49ers' championship season as Montana's backup, he played in eight games, starting one; and in the Giants' 1990 championship season he was a backup to Phil Simms and Jeff Hostetler, though he did not have any playing time.

Simms had been injured during a December 1990 game against the Buffalo Bills on a hit by Leon Seals and was unable to play in the Super Bowl (also against the Bills), with Hostetler taking over. Cavanaugh warmed up during the Super Bowl as Hostetler suffered a number of blows from the Buffalo Bills pass rush (and a particularly hard hit from Seals), but did not come into the game despite Hostetler playing the first half in "'kind of a blur'".

Cavanaugh’s most prolific season came in 1981, when he started eight of 16 games for the Patriots. Over four years, he started 15 games for the Patriots, backing up an injured Steve Grogan, but in his final five years did not start any games; throwing only 21 passes during those years.

Cavanaugh retired as a professional player following the 1991 season, appearing in 112 games with 19 starts, completing 305 of 579 passes for 4,332 yards, 28 touchdowns, 30 interceptions and a 71.7 passer rating.

== Coaching career ==
Following his retirement, Cavanaugh became tight ends coach at Pitt for two years (1992-93), under coaches Paul Hackett and Sal Sunseri in 1992, and his old coach Johnny Majors in 1993. He also served as Pitt's chief recruiter. Cavanaugh next began coaching in professional football. He was a quarterbacks coach with the Arizona Cardinals (1994–1995) under Buddy Ryan, who had coached Cavanaugh as a player in Philadelphia; quarterbacks coach with the 49ers (1996) under George Seifert; offensive coordinator for the Chicago Bears (1997–1998) under Dave Wannstedt; and offensive coordinator with the Baltimore Ravens (1999–2004) under Brian Billick, winning Super Bowl XXXV with the Ravens in 2000.

Cavanaugh served as offensive coordinator under Wannstedt again, for his old college team the University of Pittsburgh Panthers, until 2008, when he accepted a position as an assistant coach and quarterbacks coach with the New York Jets, under Rex Ryan. He would remain with the Jets until 2012.

On January 18, 2013, it was announced that Bears head coach Marc Trestman hired Cavanaugh as the quarterbacks coach, replacing Jeremy Bates.

On January 28, 2015, Cavanaugh became Washington's quarterbacks coach. On January 23, 2017, Cavanaugh was promoted to Washington's offensive coordinator, replacing Sean McVay, who became the head coach of the Los Angeles Rams. On January 29, 2019, Cavanaugh was demoted to Washington's senior offensive assistant, where he still had a number of responsibilities. He coached in Washington under Jay Gruden.

On August 25, 2021, Cavanaugh was hired by the New York Jets as a senior offensive assistant to coach Robert Saleh.

On March 24, 2026, Cavanaugh was hired by the Washington Huskies as a senior offensive assistant to coach Jedd Fisch.
