= Randy Holloway =

American football player (born 1955)

No. 75, 74
- Position: Defensive end

Personal information
- Born: August 26, 1955 (age 71); Sharon, Pennsylvania, U.S.
- Listed height: 6 ft 5 in (1.96 m)
- Listed weight: 250 lb (113 kg)

Career information
- High school: Sharon, Pennsylvania
- College: Pittsburgh
- NFL draft: 1978: 1st round, 21st overall pick

Career history
- Minnesota Vikings (1978–1984); St. Louis Cardinals (1984)

Awards and highlights
- National champion (1976); Consensus All-American (1977); 2× First-team All-East (1976, 1977)

Career NFL statistics
- Sacks: 28.5
- Interceptions: 1
- Touchdowns: 1
- Stats at Pro Football Reference

Randy Holloway (born August 26, 1955) is an American former professional football player who was a defensive end in the National Football League (NFL) from 1978 to 1984 for the Minnesota Vikings and the St. Louis Cardinals. He attended the University of Pittsburgh and was the Vikings first round draft pick in the 1978 NFL draft.

On September 16, 1984, Holloway recorded five sacks versus the Atlanta Falcons, which still stands (through the 2018 season) as the Vikings team record.
