= Western Athletic Conference football individual awards =

American college football awards

Coaches and media of the Western Athletic Conference (WAC) bestow the following individual awards at the end of each college football season.

== Offensive Player of the Year ==
Season	Winner	Pos.	Team
1962	Eldon Fortie	HB	BYU
1963	Tony Lorick	FB	Arizona State
1964	Stan Quintana	QB	New Mexico
1965	Virgil Carter	QB	BYU
1966	Virgil Carter (2)	QB	BYU
1967	Paul Toscano	QB	Wyoming
1968	Art Malone	FB	Arizona State
1969	Dave Buchanan	RB	Arizona State
1970	Joe Spagnola	QB	Arizona State
1971	Rocky Long	QB	New Mexico
1972	Woody Green	RB	Arizona State
1973	Danny White	QB	Arizona State
1974	Gary Sheide	QB	BYU
1975	Bruce Hill	QB	Arizona
1976	Gifford Nielsen	QB	BYU
1977	Marc Wilson	QB	BYU
1978	Jim McMahon	QB	BYU
1978	Mike Williams	RB	New Mexico
1979	Marc Wilson (2)	QB	BYU
1980	Jim McMahon (2)	QB	BYU
1981	Jim McMahon (3)	QB	BYU
1982	Steve Young	QB	BYU
1983	Steve Young (2)	QB	BYU
1984	Robbie Bosco	QB	BYU
1985	Bart Weiss	QB	Air Force
1986	Steve Bartalo	RB	Colorado State
1987	Todd Santos	QB	San Diego State
1988	Randy Welniak	QB	Wyoming
1989	Dee Dowis	QB	Air Force
1990	Ty Detmer	QB	BYU
1991	Ty Detmer (2)	QB	BYU
1992	Marshall Faulk	RB	San Diego State
1993	Trent Dilfer	QB	Fresno State
1994	Stoney Case	QB	New Mexico
1995	George Jones	RB	San Diego State
1996	Beau Morgan	QB	Air Force (Pacific)
1996	Marcus Harris	WR	Wyoming (Pacific)
1996	Steve Sarkisian	QB	BYU (Mountain)
1997	Moses Moreno	QB	Colorado State (Pacific)
1997	Graham Leigh	QB	New Mexico (Mountain)
1998	Jamie Kimbrough	TB	Fresno State (Pacific)
1998	Blane Morgan	QB	Air Force (Mountain)
1999	LaDainian Tomlinson	RB	TCU
2000	LaDainian Tomlinson (2)	RB	TCU
2001	David Carr	QB	Fresno State
2002	Brock Forsey	RB	Boise State
2003	Ryan Dinwiddie	QB	Boise State
2004	Ryan Moats	RB	Louisiana Tech
2005	B. J. Mitchell	RB	Nevada
2006	Colt Brennan	QB	Hawaii
2007	Colt Brennan (2)	QB	Hawaii
2008	Colin Kaepernick	QB	Nevada
2009	Kellen Moore	QB	Boise State
2010	Colin Kaepernick (2)	QB	Nevada
2010	Kellen Moore (2)	RB	Boise State
2011	Robert Turbin	RB	Utah State
2012	Colby Cameron	QB	Louisiana Tech
2021	Xavier Gipson	WR	Stephen F. Austin
2022	Xavier Gipson (2)	WR	Stephen F. Austin

== Defensive Player of the Year ==
Season	Winner	Pos.	Team
1981	Steve Clark	DL	Utah
1981	Kyle Whittington	LB	BYU
1982	Johnny Jackson	LB	New Mexico
1983	Raymond Morris	LB	UTEP
1984	Chris Funk	DL	Air Force
1984	Kyle Morrell	DB	BYU
1984	Filipo Mokofisi	DL	Utah
1985	Jason Buck	DT	BYU
1986	Al Noga	DT	Hawaii
1987	Chad Hennings	DT	Air Force
1988	Pat Rabold	DT	Wyoming
1989	Mitch Donahue	DE	Wyoming
1990	Mitch Donahue (2)	DE	Wyoming
1991	Carlton McDonald	DB	Air Force
1992	Carlton McDonald (2)	DB	Air Force
1993	Barron Wortham	LB	UTEP
1994	Luther Elliss	DT	Utah
1995	Brady Smith	DE	Colorado State
1996	Chris Gizzi	LB	Air Force (Pacific)
1996	Shay Muirbrook	LB	BYU (Mountain)
1997	Chris Gizzi (2)	LB	Air Force (Pacific)
1997	Chris Bordano	LB	SMU (Mountain)
1998	Rob Morris	LB	BYU (Pacific)
1998	Bryce Fisher	DT	Air Force (Mountain)
1999	Brian Young	DE	UTEP
2000	Aaron Schobel	DE	TCU
2001	Alan Harper	DT	Fresno State
2002	Quintin Mikell	DB	Boise State
2003	Travis LaBoy	DE	Hawaii
2004	Robert Rodriguez	LB	UTEP
2005	Garrett McIntyre	DL	Fresno State
2006	Korey Hall	LB	Boise State
2007	Marcus Riley	LB	Fresno State
2008	Solomon Elimimian	LB	Hawaii
2008	Jarron Gilbert	DT	San Jose State
2009	Dontay Moch	DE	Nevada
2010	Chris Carter	DL	Fresno State
2011	Bobby Wagner	LB	Utah State
2012	Travis Johnson	DL	San Jose State
2021	Devin Hafford	DB	Tarleton State
2022	Kavian Gaither	DB	Sam Houston

== Special Teams Player of the Year ==
Season	Winner	Pos.	Team
1991	Robert Rivers	RS	Wyoming
1992	Jason Elam	K	Hawaii
1993	Chris MacInnis	K	Air Force
1994	David Dunn	RS	Fresno State
1995	James Dye	RS	BYU
2022	Jake Gerardi	P	Southern Utah

== Lineman of the Year ==
Season	Winner	Pos.	Team
1962	Dave Costa	OT	Utah
1963	Eddie Stokes	C	New Mexico
1964	John Briscoe	C	Arizona
1965	Phil Odle	SE	BYU
1966	John Stipech	DT	Utah
1967	Curley Culp	MG	Arizona State
1968	Tom Nelson	DT	Arizona
1969	Jeff Slipp	DE	BYU
1970	Bill McKinley	DE	Arizona
1971	Gordon Gravelle	OL	BYU
1972	John Urban	OT	New Mexico
1973	Ron Rydalch	DT	Utah
1974	Bob Bruenig	LB	Arizona
1975	Mike Dawson	DL	Arizona
1976	Robin Cole	DL	New Mexico
1977	Mike Bell	DL	Colorado State
1978	Ken Fantetti	LB	Wyoming
1979	Tom Bell	DL	BYU
1980	Nick Eyre	DL	BYU

== Newcomer of the Year ==
Season	Winner	Pos.	Team
1971	Woody Green	RB	Arizona State
1972	Paul Linford	DT	BYU
1973	Bruce Hill	QB	Arizona
1974	Bobby McKinley	QB	UTEP
1975	Willie Scroggins	DL	Arizona State
1976	Jack Steptoe	S / WR	Utah
1977	Myron Hardeman	RB	Wyoming
1978	Jeff Lyall	DE	Utah
1979	Tom Tuinei	DL	Hawaii
1980	Niko Noga	DL	Hawaii
1981	Johnny Jackson	LB	New Mexico
1982	Jay Haynes	OLB	Wyoming
1983	Steve Bartalo	RB	Colorado State
1984	Eddie Johnson	RB	Utah
1984	Galand Thaxton	LB	Wyoming
1985	Larry Egger	QB	Utah
1986	Anthony Sargent	WR	Wyoming
1987	Pat Hegarty	QB	UTEP
1988	Dabby Dawson	RB	Wyoming
2022	Beau Allen	QB	Tarleton State

== Freshman of the Year ==
Season	Winner	Pos.	Team
1989	Jamal Farmer	RB	Hawaii
1990	Barron Wortham	LB	UTEP
1991	Marshall Faulk	RB	San Diego State
1992	Winslow Oliver	RB	New Mexico
1993	Steve Scifres	OT	Wyoming
1994	Will Blackwell	WR	San Diego State
1995	Chris Fuamatu-Ma'afala	RB	Utah
1996	Jon Denton	QB	UNLV (Pacific)
1996	Ronney Jenkins	RB	BYU (Mountain)
1997	Charles Tharp	RB	Hawaii (Pacific)
1997	Jaron Dabney	S	BYU (Mountain)
1998	Jerome Haywood	DT	San Diego State (Pacific)
1998	James Sunia	LB	UNLV (Mountain)
1999	Josh Blankenship	QB	Tulsa
2000	Timmy Chang	QB	Hawaii
2001	Chance Kretschmer	RB	Nevada
2002	Paul Pinegar	QB	Fresno State
2003	Nick Bunting	LB	Tulsa
2004	Ryan Wendell	OT / C	Fresno State
2004	Quintin Demps	S	UTEP
2005	Davone Bess	WR	Hawaii
2006	Paul Igboeli	LB	Utah State
2007	Colin Kaepernick	QB	Nevada
2008	Kellen Moore	QB	Boise State
2009	Brandon Wimberly	WR	Nevada
2010	Keith Smith	LB	San Jose State
2011	Cody Fajardo	QB	Nevada
2012	Kenneth Dixon	RB	Louisiana Tech
2021	Kamren Washington	DL	Sam Houston

== Coach of the Year ==
League coaches have made selections since 1962.

Conference champion. (Note: Does not include co-championships.)

Season	Winner	Team
1962	Hal Mitchell	BYU
1963	Frank Kush	Arizona State
1964	Ray Nagel	Utah
1965	Tommy Hudspeth	BYU
1966	Lloyd Eaton	Wyoming
1967	Lloyd Eaton (2)	Wyoming
1968	Darrell Mudra	Arizona
1969	Bill Meek	Utah
1970	Frank Kush (2)	Arizona State
1971	Frank Kush (3)	Arizona State
1972	LaVell Edwards	BYU
1973	Jim Young	Arizona
1974	Gil Bartosh	UTEP
1975	Frank Kush (4)	Arizona State
1976	Fred Akers	Wyoming
1977	Frank Kush (5)	Arizona State
1978	Wayne Howard	Utah
1979	LaVell Edwards (2)	BYU
1980	LaVell Edwards (3)	BYU
1981	Dick Tomey	Hawaii
1982	Ken Hatfield	Air Force
1983	LaVell Edwards (4)	BYU
1984	LaVell Edwards (5)	BYU
1985	Fisher DeBerry	Air Force
1986	Denny Stolz	San Diego State
1987	Paul Roach	Wyoming
1988	Paul Roach (2)	Wyoming
1989	Bob Wagner	Hawaii
1990	LaVell Edwards (6)	BYU
1991	Al Luginbill	San Diego State
1992	Bob Wagner (2)	Hawaii
1993	Dennis Franchione	New Mexico
1994	Sonny Lubick	Colorao State
1995	Fisher DeBerry (2)	Air Force
1996	Joe Tiller	Wyoming
1996	LaVell Edwards (7)	BYU
1997	Dennis Franchione (2)	New Mexico
1997	Sonny Lubick (2)	Colorado State
1998	Ted Tollner	San Diego State
1998	Fisher DeBerry (3)	Air Force
1999	June Jones	Hawaii
2000	Gary Nord	UTEP
2001	Jack Bicknell Jr.	Louisiana Tech
2002	Dan Hawkins	Boise State
2003	Steve Kragthorpe	Tulsa
2004	Dan Hawkins (2)	Boise State
2005	Chris Ault	Nevada
2006	June Jones (2)	Hawaii
2007	June Jones (3)	Hawaii
2008	Chris Petersen	Boise State
2009	Chris Petersen (2)	Boise State
2010	Chris Ault (2)	Nevada
2011	Sonny Dykes	Louisiana Tech
2012	Gary Andersen	Utah State
2021	K. C. Keeler	Sam Houston
2022	Keith Patterson	Abilene Christian

== Notes and references ==
Notes

General references

- "WAC Offensive Player of the Year Winners". Sports Reference.
- "WAC Defensive Player of the Year Winners". Sports Reference.

Footnotes
