= Tony Adams (quarterback) =

American gridiron football player (born 1950)

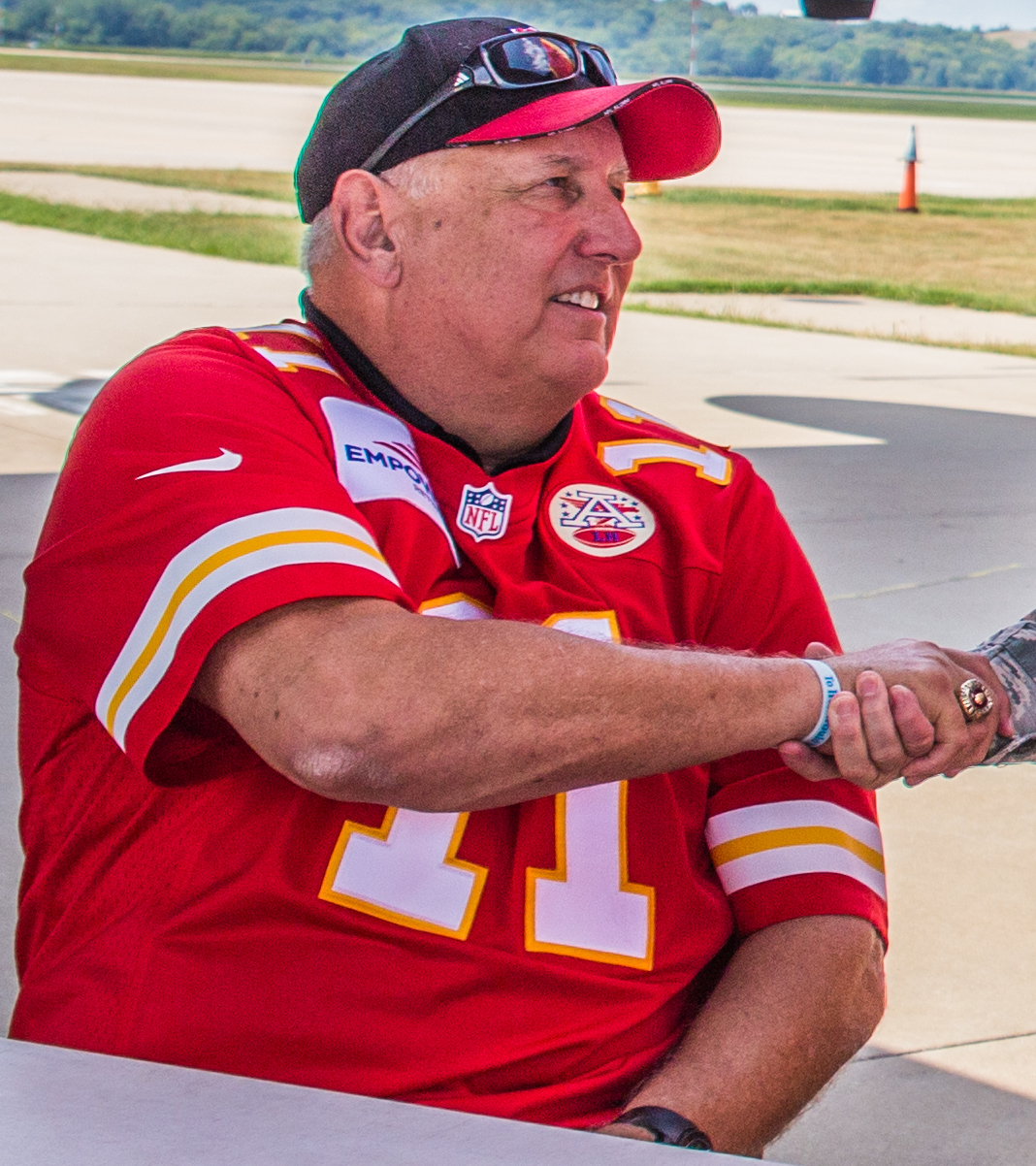
- Adams in 2017

No. 11, 7
- Position: Quarterback

Personal information
- Born: March 19, 1950 (age 76); San Antonio, Texas, U.S.
- Listed height: 6 ft 0 in (1.83 m)
- Listed weight: 198 lb (90 kg)

Career information
- High school: Ramona (Riverside, California)
- College: Utah State
- NFL draft: 1973: 14th round, 343rd overall pick

Career history
- San Diego Chargers (1973)*; Southern California Sun (1974); Kansas City Chiefs (1975–1978); Toronto Argonauts (1979–1980); Minnesota Vikings (1987)
- * Offseason or practice squad member only

Awards and highlights
- All-WFL (1974); WFL Tri-MVP – 1974; Second-team All-American (1972)

Career NFL statistics
- Passing attempts: 408
- Passing completions: 212
- Completion percentage: 52.0%
- TD–INT: 12–27
- Passing yards: 2,733
- Passer rating: 55.5
- Stats at Pro Football Reference

Anthony Lee Adams (born March 9, 1950) is an American former professional football player who was a quarterback in the National Football League (NFL), World Football League (WFL), and Canadian Football League (CFL).

== College career ==
Adams played college football at Utah State in Logan from 1970 through 1972. Prior to that he'd been with the Texas Longhorns Football on their freshman team in 1968 and then at Riverside Community College in 1969. With the Aggies, he was the starting quarterback for three years, and the team had a record of 21 wins, 11 losses, and 1 tie. He didn't miss any games, playing in all 33 contests.

As a senior in 1972, Adams set an NCAA record on November 11 with 561 net passing yards and five touchdowns in a 44–16 Aggie win over the Utah Utes. The teams combined for an NCAA record 950 passing yards, and Adams' 561 yards stood for five years, until broken by BYU's Marc Wilson in 1977, also against Utah. The head coach that worked with Adams for all 3 seasons was Chuck Mills; Adams' number 11 jersey was retired by Utah State in 1972.

Adams' final game for Utah State was at home against Weber State on Thanksgiving. Seldom-injured, he left the game early in the first quarter with a lower leg injury, hobbled around the sidelines, and changed into his street clothes at halftime. When the Aggies fell behind early in the fourth quarter, Adams got back in uniform and re-entered the game.

=== NCAA statistics ===
Year	Team	GP	Comp	Att	Pct	Yds	Avg	TD	Int	Rtg
1970	Utah State	11	108	232	46.6	1,394	6	16	14	107.7
1971	Utah State	11	144	284	50.7	2,035	7.2	14	11	119.4
1972	Utah State	11	204	351	58.1	2,797	8	22	9	140.6
Total		33	456	867	52.6	6,226	7.2	52	34	124.9

== Professional career ==
Adams was selected in the 1973 NFL draft by the San Diego Chargers in the 14th round (343rd overall).https://www.pro-football-reference.com/players/K/KrakMe20.htm He never actually played for the team that drafted him.

=== Hartford Knights ===
His first actual professional season began with the Hartford Knights of the Atlantic Coast Football League. He played with them in 1973, recording 10 passing touchdowns.

=== Southern California Sun ===
Adams played with the Southern California Sun in the World Football League (WFL) in 1974, where he statistically had his best pro season, completing 276 of 510 passes for 3905 yards and 23 TDs and 18 interceptions. He was an All-WFL selection that season. He was also named one of the WFL's Tri-MVP's during the 1974 season. He shared this award with Tommy Reamon of the Florida Blazers and J.J. Jennings of the Memphis Southmen. Adams led the Sun to a 13–7 record and the team won the 1974 WFL Western Division. They faced the Hawaiians in the opening round of the '74 WFL playoffs and fell by a score of 32–14.

=== Kansas City Chiefs ===
After being released by the Southern California Sun on January 13, 1975, Adams was signed as a free agent on April 18 by the Kansas City Chiefs. He would spend four years with the Chiefs, during which he appeared in 50 games, 7 of them as the starting quarterback. He was never able to reach the success that he had in the WFL, winning only 1 of the 7 games that he started. He completed 163 of 319 passing attempts for 2,126 yards, 9 TDs, and 22 interceptions. Adams would no longer be a member of the Chiefs after the 1978 season.

=== Toronto Argonauts ===
Adams played 20 games over two seasons (1979–1980) for the Toronto Argonauts of the CFL. His best year was 1979, when he completed 241 of 394 passes for 2,692 yards, with 13 touchdowns and 18 interceptions.

=== Minnesota Vikings ===
He finished his career as a strike replacement player with the Minnesota Vikings in 1987. By this time, Adams was already 37 years old, and this stint with the Vikings didn't do much to revive his career. This was the first playing time he saw since playing in his last season in the CFL in 1980. He started in all 3 games that he played in for the Vikings, losing all three of those games. He completed 49 of his 89 pass attempts for 607 yards while posting 3 touchdown passes and 5 interceptions.

== Professional statistics ==
=== WFL statistics ===
Year	Team	GP	Comp	Att	Pct	Yds	Avg	TD	Int
1974	SCS	20	276	510	54	3,905	7.7	23	18
Total		20	276	510	54	3,905	7.7	23	18

=== CFL statistics ===
Year	Team	GP	Comp	Att	Pct	Yds	Avg	TD	Int	Rtg
1979	TOR	16	241	394	61.2	2,692	6.8	13	18	73.5
1980	TOR	4	39	72	54.2	539	7.5	0	6	43.7
Total		20	280	466	60.1	3,231	6.9	13	24	68.9

=== NFL statistics ===
				Passing								Rushing				Sacked		Fumbles		Team Record
Year	Team	GP	GS	Comp	Att	Pct	Yds	Y/A	TD	Int	Rtg	Att	Yds	Avg	TD	Sack	Yds	Fum	Lost	W/L (as starter)
1975	KC	6	2	36	77	46.8	445	5.8	2	4	52.1	8	42	5.3	0	11	85	4	4	0–2
1976	KC	14	0	36	71	50.7	575	8.1	3	4	68.7	5	46	9.2	0	9	79	1	0	0–0
1977	KC	14	3	47	92	51.1	691	7.5	2	11	43.6	5	21	4.2	0	18	136	1	1	1–2
1978	KC	16	2	44	79	55.7	415	5.3	2	3	63	9	15	1.7	0	3	27	0	0	0–2
1987	MIN	3	3	49	89	55.1	607	6.8	3	5	64.2	11	31	2.8	0	18	120	3	3	0–3
Total		53	10	212	408	52	2,733	6.7	12	27	55.5	38	155	4.1	0	59	447	9	8	1–9
