= 1977 BYU Cougars football team =

American college football season

1977 BYU Cougars football

WAC co-champion
- Conference: Western Athletic Conference

Ranking
- Coaches: No. 16
- AP: No. 20
- Record: 9–2 (6–1 WAC)
- Head coach: LaVell Edwards (6th season)
- Offensive coordinator: Doug Scovil (2nd season)
- Offensive scheme: West Coast
- Defensive coordinator: Dick Felt (6th season)
- Base defense: 4–3
- Home stadium: Cougar Stadium

1977 Western Athletic Conference football standings
	Conf.					Overall
Team	W		L		T	W		L		T
No. 20 BYU +	6	–	1	–	0	9	–	2	–	0
No. 18 Arizona State +	6	–	1	–	0	9	–	3	–	0
Colorado State	5	–	2	–	0	9	–	2	–	1
Wyoming	4	–	3	–	0	4	–	6	–	1
Arizona	3	–	4	–	0	5	–	7	–	0
New Mexico	2	–	5	–	0	5	–	7	–	0
Utah	2	–	5	–	0	3	–	8	–	0
UTEP	0	–	7	–	0	1	–	10	–	0
+ – Conference co-champions; Rankings from AP Poll

The 1977 BYU Cougars football team represented Brigham Young University (BYU) for the 1977 NCAA Division I football season. The Cougars were led by sixth-year head coach LaVell Edwards and played their home games at Cougar Stadium in Provo, Utah. The team competed as a member of the Western Athletic Conference, winning a share of the conference title for the second consecutive year, sharing the title with Arizona State with a conference record of 6–1.

The previous season, BYU was invited to the Tangerine Bowl, where they lost to Oklahoma State. Despite finishing the regular season with a record of 9–2 and ranked 17th in the AP Poll, the Cougars were not invited to a bowl game and dropped to twentieth in the final poll, and tied for sixteenth in the UPI Coaches Poll.

== Schedule ==
Date	Time	Opponent	Rank	Site	Result	Attendance	Source
September 10	7:30 pm	Kansas State*		Cougar Stadium; Provo, UT	W 39–0	35,196	
September 24	12:50 pm	at Utah State*	No. 20	Romney Stadium; Logan, UT (rivalry)	W 65–6	20,103	
September 30	7:30 pm	New Mexico	No. 15	Cougar Stadium; Provo, UT	W 54–19	33,352	
October 8	2:30 pm	at Oregon State*	No. 13	Parker Stadium; Corvallis, OR	L 19–24	33,965	
October 15	1:30 pm	Colorado State		Hughes Stadium; Fort Collins, CO	W 63–17	29,110	
October 22	1:30 pm	at Wyoming	No. 17	War Memorial Stadium; Laramie, WY	W 10–7	25,398	
October 29	1:30 pm	Arizona^{†}	No. 17	Cougar Stadium; Provo, UT	W 34–14	33,621	
November 5	1:30 pm	Utah	No. 14	Cougar Stadium; Provo, UT (Holy War)	W 38–8	34,208	
November 12	7:30 pm	at No. 17 Arizona State	No. 13	Sun Devil Stadium; Tempe, AZ	L 13–24	58,295	
November 19	1:30 pm	Long Beach State*	No. 17	Cougar Stadium; Provo, UT	W 30–27	21,322	
November 26	7:30 pm	at UTEP	No. 18	Sun Bowl; El Paso, TX	W 68–19	7,800	
*Non-conference game; ^{†}Homecoming; Rankings from AP Poll released prior to the game; All times are in Mountain time

== Game summaries ==
=== Utah State ===
Senior quarterback Gifford Nielsen completed 30 of 40 passes for 321 yards and six touchdowns. Head coach LaVell Edwards pulled Nielsen with about three minutes left in the first half and again at 3:46 in the third quarter while three more potential touchdown passes were dropped otherwise Nielsen's stats would have been even greater. On the road in Logan, the BYU players were actually cheered by the Utah State fans as they left field.

=== Oregon State ===
Starting quarterback Nielsen injured his knee late in the loss at Corvallis on October 8, ending his collegiate career; he was replaced by sophomore Marc Wilson. The struggling Oregon State Beavers were seven-point underdogs, and went winless in the Pac-10 Conference.

=== Utah ===
Utah Utes at #14 BYU Cougars

Quarter	1	2	3	4	Total
Utah	0	2	6	0	8
BYU	17	0	0	21	38

at Cougar Stadium • Provo, Utah

- Date: November 5
- Game time: 1:30 p.m. MST
- Game weather: Overcast • 60 °F (16 °C)
- Game attendance: 33,828
- CougarStats

Game information

Utah

- Randy Gomez
  15/41, 131 Yds, 2 INT
- Jeffrey Parker
  24 Rush, 98 Yds
  3 Rec, 28 Yds

BYU

- Marc Wilson
  26/41, 571 Yds, 5 TD, 3 INT
- Todd Christensen
  9 Rush, 32 Yds
- Mike Chronister
  4 Rec, 176 Yds, TD

BYU's Marc Wilson threw for 571 yards, breaking the single-game NCAA record set by Utah State's Tony Adams in 1972, also against Utah. Wilson was pulled with two minutes left, but returned a minute later and completed three passes, including a touchdown to John VanDerWouden, to set the record, which drew the ire of Utah head coach Wayne Howard.

Scoring summary

Quarter	Time	Drive			Team	Scoring information	Score	
Quarter	Time	Plays	Yards	TOP	Team	Scoring information	UTAH	BYU
1					BYU	23-yard field goal by Duke	0	3
1					BYU	Christensen 11-yard touchdown reception from Wilson, Duke kick good	0	10
1					BYU	Chronister 72-yard touchdown reception from Wilson, Duke kick good	0	17
2					Utah	Safety, international grounding penalty by Wilson in end zone	2	17
3					Utah	Liapis 12-yard touchdown run, 2-point pass failed	8	17
4					BYU	VanDerWouden 14-yard touchdown reception from Wilson, Duke kick good	8	24
4					BYU	Thompson 26-yard touchdown reception from Wilson, Duke kick good	8	31
4					BYU	VanDerWouden 8-yard touchdown reception from Wilson, Duke kick good	8	38
"TOP" = time of possession. For other American football terms, see Glossary of American football.							8	38

== Roster ==
1977 BYU Cougars football team roster
Players
Coaches
Offense

Pos.	#	Name	Class
TE	95	Rob Anderson	So
RB	23	Clay Blackwell	So
QB	12	Ray Brock	So
TE	85	Clay Brown	So
OT	64	Alan Carlile	So
FB	30	Steve Carlson	So
FB	33	Todd Christensen	Sr
WR	29	Mike Chronister	Jr
OT	63	Calvin Close	So
WR		Bill Davis	Fr
OT	66	Russ Davis	Jr
OT	72	Nick Eyre	Fr
QB	17	Mark Flammer	Jr
G	58	Clayton Forsythe	Jr
RB		Dave Francis	Fr
OT	76	Al Gaspard	Jr
WR	88	Bruce George	Jr
FB	24	Roger Gourley	Sr
G	62	Danny Hansen	So
TE		Brad Hardisty	Fr
WR	26	George Harris	Sr
OT	72	Kelly Harris	Sr
QB	11	Dan Hartwig	So
QB		Mike Heinrich	Fr
TE	86	Richard Herlin	Jr
OT		Steve Herring	Fr
OT	70	Jim Jaramillo	So
WR	87	Lloyd Jones	So
WR	84	Rick Jones	Sr
RB	20	Robbie Kahuanui	So
RB	31	Larry Kemp	Jr
RB	36	Eric Lane	Fr
WR		Ron Lewis	Jr
G	67	Raymond Linford	So
OT		Walt Manwill	Fr
QB	7	Terry McEwen	Sr
QB	9	Jim McMahon	Fr
C	54	Tom Miller	Sr
QB	14	Gifford Nielsen	Sr
C	50	Scott Nielson	So
OT	75	Bart Oates	Fr
C	55	Corey Pace	So
OT		Nelson Paynter	Jr
QB		Scott Phillips	Fr
RB		Scott Reber	Fr
OT	78	Lance Reynolds	Sr
RB	35	Bill Ring	Jr
FB		Kim Stewart	Jr
G	59	Gary Stoddard	Jr
C	52	Brad Sullivan	Jr
TE		Norman Taylor	Fr
TE	92	Tod Thompson	Jr
WR	25	Kent Tingey	Jr
G	77	Keith Uperesa	Sr
OT	69	Jan Van de Merwe	Sr
WR	8	John VanDerWouden	Sr
FB	34	Roy Ward	Sr
RB	32	Ken White	So
FB	44	Vic Whitsett	So
RB	48	Doug Williams	So
QB	6	Marc Wilson	So
RB	43	Casey Wingard	Jr
WR		Stan Younger	Fr
WR	22	Lynn Zwahlen	So

Defense

Pos.	#	Name	Class
DB	42	Steve Anderson	So
DE	90	Kip Apostol	Sr
DT	65	Craig Barr	So
LB		Russ Beck	Jr
LB	41	Mark Berntsen	Sr
LB	53	Gary Bouck	Jr
S	23	Perry Bradford	So
DB		Mark Brady	Fr
DE	68	Rob Buchanan	Jr
LB	48	Scott Garrett	So
DB	10	Dave Campos	Sr
S	21	Jason Coloma	Jr
CB	13	Steve Corson	Jr
LB	45	Tom Enlow	Jr
LB		Danny Frazier	Fr
LB	56	Brian Hansen	So
DE	89	Jeff Harris	Jr
DB	16	Steve Hartmann	So
DE		Greg Head	Jr
CB	27	Tony Hernandez	Sr
DT	80	Mekeli Ieremia	Sr
DE	93	Conrad Jepson	So
LB	37	Gary Kama	Jr
CB	15	David McKee	So
DE	83	Mat Mendenhall	So
LB	82	Larry Miller	Jr
S	47	John Neal	Jr
DT	71	Gary Peterson	Sr
DE	96	Rick Pinckard	So
DB	19	Bill Popin	Sr
CB	5	Bob Prested	So
LB	49	John Ramage	So
LB	41	Glen Redd	So
DB		Bill Schoepflin	Fr
DT	73	Bob Simmerman	Jr
DT	79	Doug Stromberg	So
S	46	Mark Swenson	Jr
DT	60	Jeff Taggart	So
DB	18	Mark Terranova	Sr
DE	91	Ross Varner	Jr
S	9	Ron Velasco	Jr
DE	94	Dennis Webb	So
LB	36	Rod Wood	Jr

Special teams

Pos.	#	Name	Class
K	3	Dev Duke	Sr
K	2	Brent Johnson	So
K		Craig Wing	So
P	9	Jim McMahon	Fr

Head coach

- LaVell Edwards

Coordinators/assistant coaches

- Norm Chow
  Wide receivers
- Dick Felt
  Defensive coordinator/defensive backs
- Garth Hall
  Running backs
- Dave Kragthorpe
  Assistant head coach/offensive line
- Mel Olson
  Junior Varsity
- Tom Ramage
  Defensive line
- Doug Scovil
  Offensive coordinator/quarterbacks
- Fred Whittingham
  Linebackers

Legend

- (C) Team captain
- (S) Suspended
- (I) Ineligible
- Injured
- Redshirt

Roster
Last update: 2018-Dec-25

== Statistics ==
=== Passing ===
Player	Comp	Att	Yards	TD	INT
Marc Wilson	164	277	2,418	24	18
Gifford Nielsen	98	156	1,167	16	3
Jim McMahon	10	16	103	1	1
Terry McEwen	3	3	32	0	0
Scott Phillips	1	2	29	0	1
Dan Hartwig	1	2	9	0	0
John VanDerWouden	0	1	0	0	0

- Starting quarterback Nielsen was lost for the season late in the fourth game.

== Awards ==
- WAC Offensive Player of the Year: QB Marc Wilson
- All-WAC: LB Mark Berntsen, RB Todd Christensen, WR Mike Chronister, OL Jason Coloma, DL Mekeli Ieremia, OL Lance Reynolds

== NFL draft ==
Player	Position	Round	Pick	NFL club
Todd Christensen	Tight end	2	56	Dallas Cowboys
Gifford Nielsen	Quarterback	3	73	Houston Oilers
Mekeli Ieremia	Defensive end	6	158	Chicago Bears
Lance Reynolds	Tackle	9	241	Pittsburgh Steelers
