= Holy War (BYU–Utah) =

Football Rivalry between Brigham Young University and the University of Utah

Holy War (BYU vs. Utah)
- BYU Cougars Utah Utes
- Sport: American college football
- First meeting: April 6, 1896; Utah, 12–4 (per Utah); October 14, 1922; Utah, 49–0 (per BYU)
- Latest meeting: November 7, 2026; Utah, 28–20
- Next meeting: 2027
- Stadiums: LaVell Edwards Stadium (BYU); Rice–Eccles Stadium (Utah)
- Trophy: Beehive Boot

Statistics
- Total meetings: 104 (per Utah); 98 (per BYU)
- All-time series: Utah leads, 63–37–4 (per Utah); Utah leads, 60–34–4 (per BYU)
- Largest victory: BYU: 56–6 (1980); Utah: 49–0 (1922)
- Longest win streak: Utah: 9 (1929–37, 2010–19); BYU: 9 (1979–87)
- Longest unbeaten streak: Utah: 21 (1898–1941)
- Current win streak: Utah, 1 (2026–present)

Locations of BYU and Utah

The Holy War is the name given to the American college football rivalry game played by the Brigham Young University (BYU) Cougars and the University of Utah (U of U) Utes, nearly annually. It is part of the larger BYU–Utah sports rivalry. In this context, the term "Holy War" refers to the fact that BYU is owned and administered by the Church of Jesus Christ of Latter-day Saints (LDS Church) with a 98% LDS student population and the U of U is a secular, public university, which has a substantial minority LDS student population but is much more religiously and culturally diverse. Currently, the U of U president and head football coach are Latter-day Saints.

The event is part of a three-way rivalry among Division I FBS universities from the state of Utah: BYU, U of U, and Utah State. The winner of the series wins a trophy known as the Beehive Boot.

Both teams played in the same conference from 1922 to 2010, most recently in the Western Athletic Conference (1962–1997) and the Mountain West Conference (MW) (1998–2010). During the MW years, the Holy War was often the deciding game of the conference title. Despite Utah moving to the Pac-12 Conference in 2011 and BYU becoming an independent the same year, the two universities agreed to maintain their annually scheduled game. The series was briefly interrupted in 2014 and 2015 for Utah to play a home-and-home series with Michigan — the first time the series had been interrupted since 1943 to 1945, when BYU did not field a team due to World War II. The two-year hiatus was unexpectedly cut short when the 2015 Las Vegas Bowl pitted BYU against Utah, creating the "Holy War in Sin City" in the postseason. Games had later been scheduled as non-conference matchups until 2028, with another interruption in 2022 and 2023 for Utah to play a home series with Florida.

In 2024, the rivalry became a conference matchup again after both teams joined the Big 12 Conference (BYU in 2023 and Utah in 2024).

== Origin ==
=== Origin of the term 'Holy War' ===
While the Holy War is often used to describe the BYU-Utah rivalry, the phrase wasn't used in connection with the rivalry until the 1990s when local sports talk radio hosts began coining the term. Prior to this, the Holy War was used in local media to describe the occasional matchup between BYU and Notre Dame. The term became widely used locally and nationally from 2003 to 2008, when the winner of the game simultaneously became the MWC champion, often with nationwide acclaim.

=== Rivalry components ===
Several components make the Holy War particularly fierce. The U of U and BYU are two of the biggest colleges in the state of Utah. As the name of the rivalry implies, religion is a large component of the rivalry. The U of U has a large Latter-day Saint student population and BYU is owned by the LDS Church, with its student population being almost entirely church members. The long length of rivalry is also a major element.

=== Disputed origin ===
The two schools disagree on when the first game in the series was played. Utah claims the first game was played in 1896 against Brigham Young Academy (BYA). BYU's athletic website shows their schedule dating back to 1922, but no earlier. The six games played from 1896 to 1898 ended with a 3–3 split. Utah claims these six results in the all-time series records, while BYU does not.

=== Religion ===
There's too much religion involved. I did not like that. I really didn't.

— Former Utah head coach Wayne Howard

The U of U is the flagship university of the state of Utah, a state known for its substantial Latter-day Saint population, while BYU is the flagship university of the LDS Church. The matchup has been described as taking on religious, or "church vs. state" undertones.

=== Proximity ===
When Brigham Young came into the valley, he pointed to where the University of Utah would be and said, "This is the place." Provo was just an afterthought.

— Former Utah Head Coach Ron McBride

BYU, which is in Provo, Utah, and the U of U, which is in Salt Lake City, are about 50 miles (80 km) apart, approximately an hour's drive on Interstate 15. Consequently, the two teams compete for recruits and fan support. It is not uncommon for friends, neighbors, and even family members to have opposite allegiances.

=== Team successes ===
While the two teams have not necessarily been strong at the same time, they had the most conference championships in the MWC before both left the conference in 2011. Each team has had four conference championships since the creation of the MWC in 1999. Including championships of other conferences, Utah has 24 conference championships in its history, while BYU has 23. Both of these numbers are well ahead of the current MWC member with the most conference championships, Colorado State, who has 15. The 1984 BYU Cougars football team won a consensus national champion with an undefeated season and victory over Michigan in the 1984 Holiday Bowl.

BYU again received national recognition in 1996/1997 as one of the first non-major conference teams to break into what would become the New Year's Six of the 2010s BYU finished ranked 5th in the final 1996 AP poll 1996 NCAA Division I-A football rankings.

During the era of the now-defunct Bowl Championship Series (BCS) (1998–2013), Utah played in two BCS bowls: the 2005 Fiesta Bowl (a 35–7 victory over Pitt) and the 2009 Sugar Bowl (a 31–17 victory over Alabama). For these BCS bowl victories, Utah finished ranked in the AP Poll #4 and #2, respectively. Many sports media members and observers, including ESPN's Rick Reilly, argued that Utah (as the nation's lone undefeated FBS team) should have been selected to play Florida in the BCS title game or awarded the AP national championship. Utah did receive national championship recognition from NCAA-designated major selector Anderson & Hester – which is now recognized by the NCAA in their official football guide.

=== Fanbase comparisons ===
In 2011, the New York Times polled fans of all current FBS schools to rank them according to the size of their respective fan bases. BYU was ranked #43 nationally with 709,864 people self-identifying as BYU fans, while Utah was ranked #67 with 351,939 people self-identifying as fans.

Both schools' football games are well-attended. In 2023, BYU had an average home attendance of 61,944, just below LaVell Edwards Stadium's capacity of 62,073, while in 2024, Utah had an average home attendance of 52,962, or over Rice–Eccles Stadium's stated capacity of 52,499. For the 2024 game between the schools, Rice-Eccles set a new attendance record of 54,383.

== Series history ==
=== The University of Deseret ===
The University of Deseret was established February 28, 1850, by the General Assembly of the provisional State of Deseret. This date is enshrined on the seal of the U of U. The University of Deseret closed in 1853 and was reestablished in 1867. In 1892, the school's name was changed to the University of Utah, to coincide with Utah's first football team. The team had won 1 game and lost 2 in their first campaign, including a loss to future rival Utah State. The U of U was controlled by the LDS Church from its founding until well after Statehood in 1896.

=== Brigham Young Academy years ===
Before 1903, BYU was known as BYA. During the 1890s, Utah and BYA played six times in football. The two schools split the series 3–3.

BYA stopped playing football in 1900, following a player death, and did not start again until 1922, after it had become BYU. BYU does not recognize these first six meetings and only recognizes games played from 1922 onward.

=== Utah's early dominance ===
After a twenty-three-year hiatus, BYU reinstated their football team for the 1922 season. Utah began its early dominance over BYU with a 49–0 victory on October 14, 1922. Utah maintained the winning steak until 1942, when the Cougars shocked the Utes 12–7 at Utah. The rivalry then took a hiatus from 1943 to 1945 because BYU did not field a team due to World War II. When the rivalry continued in 1946, the Utes continued their domination over the Cougars, winning or tying the next twelve contests. Except for a three-year BYU winning streak from 1965 to 1967, the rivalry continued this trend through the 1971 season, at which point Utah had amassed a 41–8–4 (.811) record against BYU.

=== LaVell Edwards era ===
In 1972, the rivalry shifted in favor of BYU, when they hired LaVell Edwards to coach the team. In his first season, BYU beat Utah 16–7 for its first victory in four years. The win signaled the beginning of BYU's dominance against Utah. From 1972 to 1992, BYU went 19–2 (.905) against Utah.

During those years, Utah went through a series of coaches that all ended with losing records against Edwards and BYU. Bill Meek's Utes went 0–2 against Edwards during Meek's last two years (1972–1973). Tom Lovat (1974–1976) was 0–3. Wayne Howard (1977–1981) was 1–4. Chuck Stobart (1982–1984) was 0–3. Jim Fassel (1985–1989) was 1–4. Finally, Utah found some success with Ron McBride (1990–2002), who had a 5–6 record against Edwards.

==== 1977–1981: Edwards versus Howard ====
===== Wayne Howard's Crusade =====
The hatred between BYU and Utah is nothing compared to what it will be. It will be a crusade to beat BYU from now on.

— Utah coach Wayne Howard, 1977

During the 1977 meeting, BYU was on the way to winning in a 38–8 blowout. Nonetheless, Edwards put starting quarterback Marc Wilson back into the game so Wilson could set an NCAA record for passing yards. Wilson succeeded in setting the record (subsequently broken) and finished the game with 571 passing yards. The incident infuriated Utah head coach Howard. After the game, he said, "This today will be inspiring. The hatred between BYU and Utah is nothing compared to what it will be. It will be a crusade to beat BYU from now on. This is a prediction: in the next two years Utah will drill BYU someday, but we won’t run up the score even if we could set an NCAA record against them." The next year, Howard made good on his promise. The Utes came from behind to upset the Cougars 23–22. The 1978 win was Utah's first against an Edwards coached BYU team.

===== Jim McMahon says, "Scoreboard." =====
What I hated the most about BYU was getting trounced.

— Former Utah tight end Steve Folsom

During the 1980 Holy War, BYU quarterback Jim McMahon helped engineer a blowout. Most of the game he was heckled by a contingent of Utah fans at Robert Rice Stadium. After throwing for another touchdown late in the 56–6 win, he pointed at the scoreboard to quiet the hecklers. The game was in the midst of a 12–1 BYU season. It was also their second consecutive win against Utah and their eighth win out of the last nine games. The fifty-point margin of victory is the largest for either team in the series.

==== 1982–1984: Edwards versus Stobart ====
On November 17, 1984, BYU entered the Holy War 10–0 and ranked #3 in the AP Poll. BYU overcame several turnovers to win 24–14. BYU would finish the season 13–0 and be the only undefeated team in Division I-A (now the Football Bowl Subdivision). They were voted number one in the final AP Poll as well as the Coaches' Poll to become consensus national champions. This was the last time a team outside the Power Five conferences won a national championship, the previous being Army in 1945.

==== 1985–1989: Edwards versus Fassel ====
In 1988, BYU had won every game since 1978 and entered the Holy War game as an 11-point favorite. Utah had a 5–5 record while BYU was 8–2 and had already accepted an invitation to the Freedom Bowl. Utah, led by quarterback Scott Mitchell, started the game by gaining a 21–0 lead on the way to winning 57–28. The 1988 team set a series record for points scored against BYU—a record that stands today. The game came to be known locally as "the Rice Bowl" because the game was played at Utah's Rice Stadium.

It was just as easy as it looked. It was like we were running against air. It was easy to break tackles and find holes. Their defense didn't seem to be there.

— BYU running back Fred Whittingham

The next year, BYU set a series record by scoring 70 against Utah. BYU jumped to a 49–0 lead before Utah scored its first touchdown just before halftime. Behind quarterback Ty Detmer, BYU scored eight touchdowns on its first eight possessions and amassed over 750 yards of total offense. Utah scored three touchdowns in the fourth quarter, leading to a final score of 70–31. The 101 points the two teams scored is still a series record.

=== 1990–2000: Edwards versus McBride ===
By the mid-1990s, the Cougars' prowess leveled off from their successes of the 1970s and 1980s. Around this time, the Utes also improved significantly, and the rivalry became much more competitive.

The nature of the rivalry began to change in 1993, during McBride's fourth season as head coach. The Utes won their first game in Provo in twenty-two seasons and their first Holy War game since Edwards became BYU's head coach. With less than a minute remaining, Utah's kicker Chris Yergensen, who had already missed two out of three field goals on the day, broke the 31–31 tie with a game-winning 55-yard field goal.

All those guys think that's all there is to life. But when I'm making $50–60,000 a year, they'll be pumping my gas. They're low-class losers.

— BYU nose guard Lenny Gomes Gregory on Utah and its fans, 1993

After the win, Utah fans and players attempted to tear down the north end zone goalpost at what was then Cougar Stadium. Cougar players returned to the field to protect the goalpost from being torn down. About the incident, Lenny Gomes, a BYU nose guard, said, "Typical Utah bullshit. All those guys think that's all there is to life. But when I'm making $50–60,000 a year, they'll be pumping my gas. They're low-class losers." The remark is still remembered in rivalry history today, although Gomes came to admit his regrets about making the statement in later years.

The 1994 season was McBride's best, as he led the Utes to a 10–2 record and a top-10 finish in national rankings. The Holy War game of that year was the first time both the Utes and Cougars played as top-25 ranked teams. The Utes won the game 34–31, which was coincidentally the same score of their meeting a year before. Utah ran its rivalry winning streak up to three games a year later, with a 34–17 win at BYU. The Utes and Cougars traded wins and losses the next couple of years, before the 2000 season.

==== 1998: The Kaneshiro Doink ====
In 1998, the first Holy War was played at the newly renovated Rice-Eccles Stadium. BYU entered the game with an 8–3 (6–1 WAC) record and was playing for a berth in the WAC Championship game. Utah entered the game with a 7–3 (5–2 WAC) record and was hoping to land a bowl game and spoil BYU's WAC Championship hopes. BYU took a 26–17 lead when Owen Pochman connected on a 47-yard field goal with 2:41 left to play in the game. On the ensuing kickoff, Utah's Daniel Jones returned the ball 95 yards to cut the lead to 26–24. BYU's possession had the ball at the 15-yard line, where Ryan Kaneshiro attempted a 32-yard field goal. The attempt bounced off the right upright, which preserved the win for BYU and caused the goalpost to shake from the "doink".

==== 1999: Utah cheerleader pummels an aggressive fan ====
Even our cheerleaders are kicking your butt.

— Utah wide receiver Steve Smith, 1999

During the 1999 edition of the Holy War, Utah recorded its fourth consecutive win in Provo. Early in the fourth quarter, Utah scored a touchdown when quarterback T.D. Croshaw completed a four-yard-pass to Donny Utu to put Utah up 20–10. In celebration, Utah cheerleader Billy Priddis ran along the visitor's sideline with a large "U" flag. Afterwards, a BYU fan ran onto the sideline and tackled Priddis from behind: Priddis then turned around and attacked the fan, landing seven or eight punches before stadium security apprehended the fan.

About the incident, Priddis said, "There's 65,000 fans here, does he think I'm not going to retaliate?" The fan was banned from the BYU campus for this incident.

From now on we're going to leave our flags at home and they should do the same.

— BYU Athletic Director Val Hale, 1999

From the Utah sideline, receiver Steve Smith taunted BYU fans and yelled, "Even our cheerleaders are kicking your butt," while BYU's athletic director Val Hale was purported to have chastised Priddis and the rest of the Utah cheerleaders.

After the game, he said, "I told them from now on we're going to leave our flags at home, and they should do the same. All it does is initiate the fans to throw things out of the stands."

==== 2000: Edwards' last game ====
Entering the 2000 season, Edwards announced that he was retiring. His final game as Cougars head coach came against the Utes in Salt Lake City, where BYU won, 34–27, with a last-minute drive that ended with a touchdown.

=== 2001 and 2002: Crowton versus McBride ===
Under new head coach Gary Crowton, BYU entered the 2001 game against Utah at 10–0 and looked to become the first team from outside the BCS to play in a BCS bowl game. A tight game ended with a comeback by BYU. BYU running back Luke Staley scored a touchdown with 1:16 left to play, and BYU DB Jenaro Gilford intercepted a pass on the ensuing Ute drive to seal the victory. The 24–21 win gave the Cougars consecutive wins against the Utes for the first time in nearly ten years. The Cougars, however, failed to "bust" the BCS, ending the season with losses to Hawaii and Louisville.

McBride entered the 2002 rivalry game in danger of being fired. The Utes had struggled all season long and even with their 13–6 victory against BYU, Utah finished with their second losing season in three years. The 5–6 finish sealed McBride's fate and he was fired in 2002; Weber State University hired him in December 2004.

=== 2003 and 2004: Crowton versus Meyer ===
Urban Meyer was hired to replace Ron McBride. Coach Meyer referred to BYU as the "Team Down South" or "TDS" (BYU being about 50 miles south of the U of U), imitating Ohio State coach Woody Hayes practice of referring to Michigan as "that team up north." This reference has become a tradition among Utah fans.

In Meyer's first season, the Utes won the MWC and finished 10–2, which was their best record since the 1994 season. The last game of the regular season, Utah beat BYU for the second straight year with a 3–0 victory. The victory snapped BYU's NCAA record for scoring in 361 straight games—BYU's first shutout since a 20–0 loss to Arizona State on September 25, 1975.

==== 2004: BCS busters ====
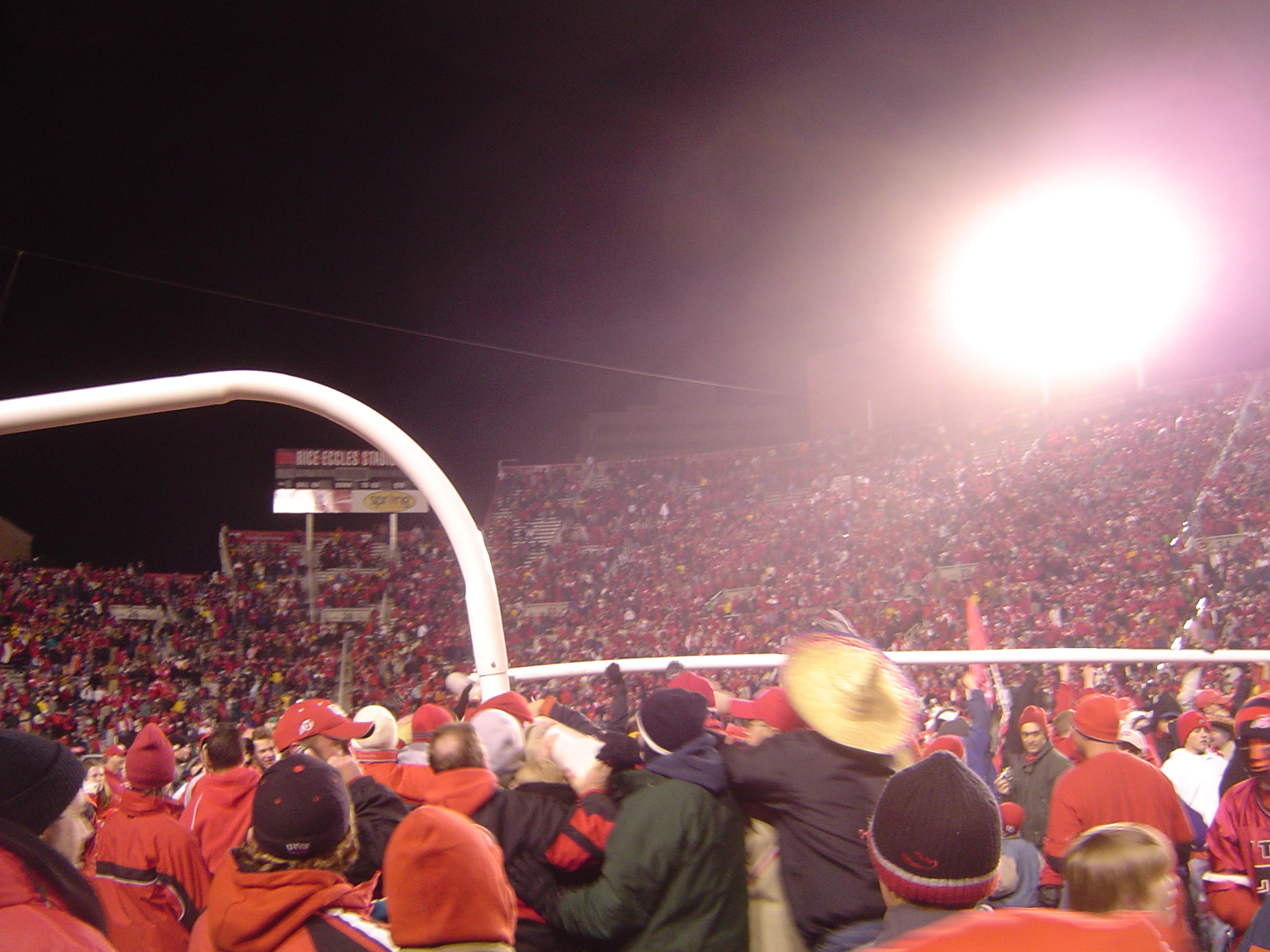
Utah fans carry the goalpost after the Utes defeated the Cougars to complete a perfect regular season

I really hate them. Playing in the game helped me understand. They are the most arrogant people. It's the whole church and state thing. They're the "good kids." We're the "bad kids." I didn't feel it in my gut last year like I do now.

— Utah quarterback Alex Smith, 2004

In 2004, Utah beat BYU 52–21 in the final regular game of the season, which clinched their invitation to a BCS bowl. The 2004 season was the U of U's best to date, with a season record of 12–0. They became the first team to "bust" the BCS, a term used to describe a team not from an Automatic Qualifying conference playing in a BCS bowl game. They went on to win their matchup against Pittsburgh in the 2005 Fiesta Bowl.

After the 2004 season both teams lost their head coaches. Meyer left Utah to coach for Florida, and BYU's Gary Crowton resigned after finishing with his third consecutive losing season.

=== 2005–2015: Mendenhall versus Whittingham ===
In 2005, Bronco Mendenhall and Kyle Whittingham started as head coaches at BYU and Utah, respectively. Whittingham, a BYU alum, was offered the job at BYU before turning it down and accepting the position at Utah, which added to the rivalry between the two coaches. Whittingham won the overall series against Mendenhall with a tally of 7–3. Eight of the ten games were decided by a touchdown or less. In a December 17, 2009, column, writer Stewart Mandel called the coaching rivalry the best coaching rivalry of that decade.

==== 2005: First overtime game ====
The 2005 season saw some striking parallels between the two programs. Both had replaced their former head coaches, struggled through parts of their seasons, and would each finish the regular season with 6–5 records. When the two met in Provo in November 2005, BYU was looking for its first win against the Utes in three seasons. Utah was looking for a winning record and a shot at a bowl game. BYU entered as the favorite because Utah would be playing without its starting quarterback and its best wide receiver, who had been injured in their previous game. The Utes' played junior college transfer Brett Ratliff as quarterback. The fourth quarter ended with a tied score of 34–34. In overtime, Ratliff completed a touchdown pass leading to a 41–34 Utah victory. Ratliff completed 17 of 32 passes for 240 yards and four touchdowns and rushed for 112 yards on 19 carries and a touchdown. He was responsible for all five Utah touchdowns.

==== 2006: Beck to Harline ====
The two teams met again in November 2006, this time in Salt Lake City. BYU gained an early lead, then fell behind and trailed for much of the game. BYU won the game 33–31 with a last-minute touchdown pass from John Beck to Jonny Harline. The win gave BYU an undefeated record of 8–0 in MWC play. Harline caught the pass on his knees in the end zone with no Utah defender near him. The play led to BYU fans creating and wearing T-shirts reading "Harline's still open."

==== 2007: Magic happens ====
Obviously, when you're doing what's right on and off the field, I think the Lord steps in and plays a part in it. Magic happens.

— BYU wide receiver Austin Collie, 2007

The 2007 game's first 12 points were only field goals, BYU's Mitch Payne scoring 9 points. Utah then scored the first touchdown, taking the lead 10–9. In the fourth quarter, BYU came back with a late-game drive that included a 4th and 18 from its own 12-yard line. Four plays later, freshman running back Harvey Unga ran for a touchdown to win it 17–10. Austin Collie, who caught the Max Hall pass to convert the 4th and 18 to a first down said about the play, "I wouldn't say it was lucky. We executed the play well. We should have had another one. Obviously, when you're doing what's right on and off the field, I think the Lord steps in and plays a part in it. Magic happens." The comment further fueled the religious animosity between the two teams.

==== 2008: BCS busting again ====
Both teams were ranked going into this game, Utah at #7 and BYU at #14. The game was fairly even until Utah scored a touchdown with 15 seconds left in the half to put the Utes up by 10. BYU cut the lead to three in the third quarter, but Utah won the game 48–24 following three touchdowns in the fourth quarter. BYU's quarterback, Max Hall, committed six turnovers during the game.

Four years after becoming the first team to bust the BCS, Utah did it again by going undefeated throughout their 2008 season. After beating BYU, they were ranked #6 going into the 2009 Sugar Bowl where they defeated #4 Alabama by a score of 31–17.

==== 2009: Second overtime game ====
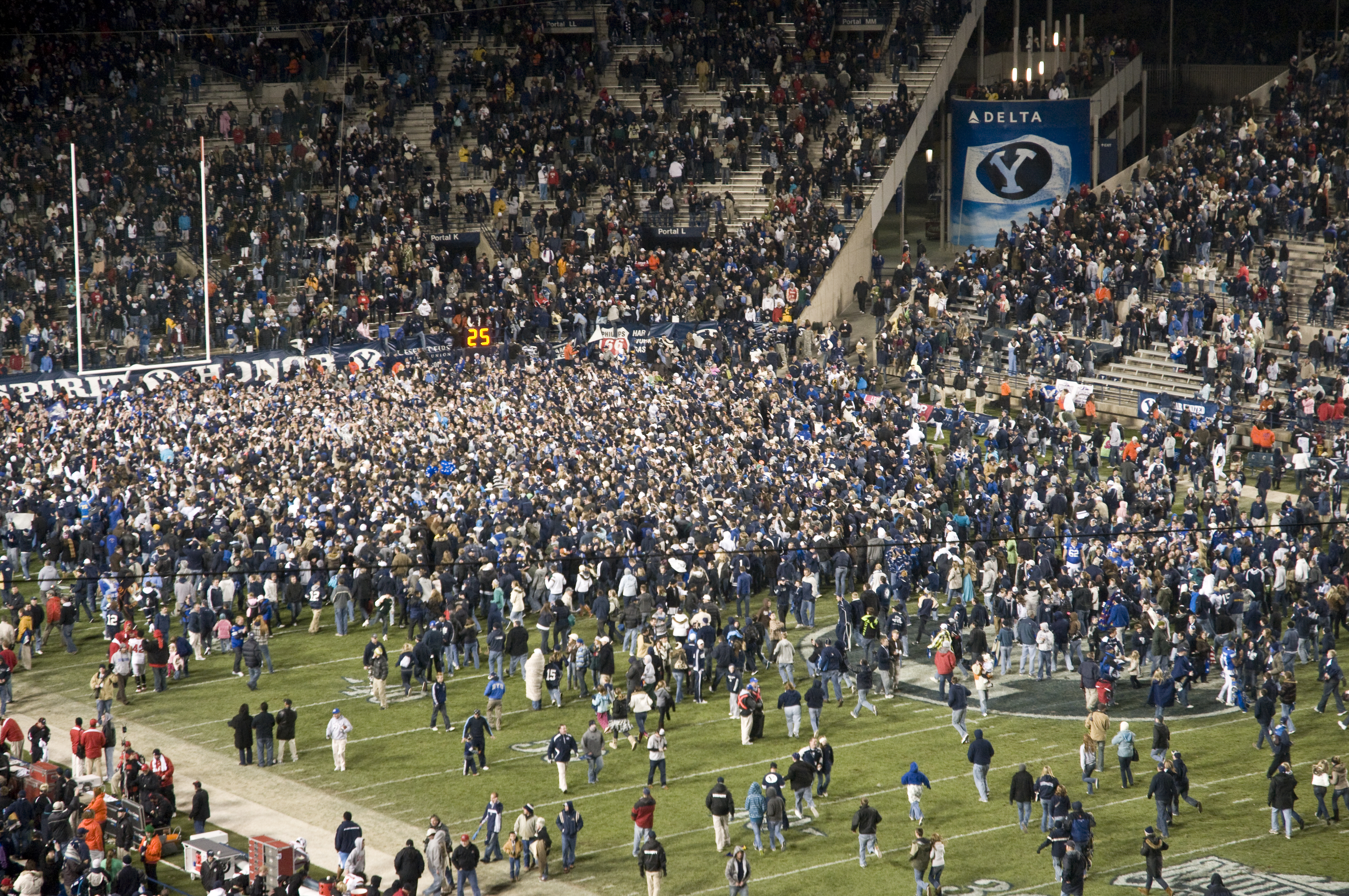
BYU fans storm the field after the overtime win of the Cougars in the 2009 game

I don't like Utah. In fact, I hate them. I hate everything about them. I hate their program, their fans. I hate everything. It felt really good to send those guys home.

— BYU quarterback Max Hall, 2009

In 2009, in the second overtime game in series history, BYU defeated Utah 26–23. BYU held a 20–6 lead entering the fourth quarter. Utah scored 14 fourth-quarter points to force overtime, but their comeback fell short. Utah managed a field goal in overtime to take a 23–20 lead, but on BYU's possession, Max Hall connected to tight end Andrew George for a 25-yard touchdown reception and the victory. The game was dubbed "George is still running" by BYU fans.

During the postgame press conference, Hall was asked if he felt he had redeemed himself for his performance in the previous year's game in which he had five interceptions and one fumble. Hall responded,

A little bit, yeah. I don't like Utah. In fact, I hate them. I hate everything about them. I hate their program. I hate their fans. I hate everything. So, it feels good to send those guys home. They didn't deserve it. It was our time, and it was our time to win. We deserved it. We played as hard as we could tonight, and it felt really good to send them home and to get them out of here, so it is a game I'll always remember.

— Max Hall

When asked for a clarification and whether he really hated Utah, Hall said, "I think the whole university and their fans and organization is classless. They threw beer on my family and stuff last year and did a whole bunch of nasty things. I don't respect them, and they deserve to lose."

The next day, Hall issued an apology for his "remarks". He alleged that his "family was spit on, had beer dumped on them and were physically assaulted on several occasions" during the previous year's game at Rice-Eccles Stadium.

==== 2010: Burton's block ====
For 2010, the game was played at Rice-Eccles Stadium in Salt Lake City. It was the last game for the two teams as conference rivals. BYU entered the game at 6–5 while Utah came in at 9–2. In a low-scoring affair, BYU successfully attempted two field goals, one in each of the first two quarters, to lead 6–0 at halftime. In the third quarter, the Cougars scored a touchdown on a 21-yard pass play from Jake Heaps to McKay Jacobson, to take a 13–0 lead. The fourth quarter began with Utah successfully attempting a 40-yard field goal, cutting the lead to 13–3, and then after Utah recovered a BYU fumble, Utah capitalized with a 37-yard touchdown pass from Jordan Wynn to Devonte Christopher to make the score 13–10. The Cougars responded with a field goal, to make it 16–10.

On Utah’s next drive, which resulted in a punt, Utah recovered a muffed return inside BYU’s 46-yard line, setting up excellent field position. Eventually scoring a Matt Asiata touchdown on a 3-yard run to take their first lead at 17–16 with 4:24 remaining. BYU then advanced to Utah’s 22-yard line, positioning Mitch Payne for a game-winning field goal attempt with 4 seconds left. However, Utah cornerback Brandon Burton raced from the outside to block the kick, securing a dramatic 17–16 Utah victory.

==== 2011: Shock and Awe ====
With Utah having left for the Pac-12 and BYU declaring conference independence, the 2011 BYU home game against Utah was the rivalry's first non-conference game since 1898. BYU suffered a rough start on its opening drive, when on its third play, the ball was snapped over quarterback Jake Heaps' head and recovered for a touchdown by Utah DE Derrick Shelby. The remainder of the 1st quarter held similar luck for BYU, with Running back JJ Diluigi being stripped of the ball on 1st and Goal from the Utah 6-yard line. The 2nd quarter proved more competitive with BYU completing a 32-yard TD pass to WR Ross Apo. Utah answered with 30-yard TD pass from QB Jordan Wynn to freshman TE Jake Murphy, just two minutes before the half. Utah led at halftime 14–10.

After a first half that seemed to promise the typical nail-biter game that the last decade of the rivalry had shown, it was anything but. The Utes scored 40 unanswered points in the 2nd half (a total of 47 unanswered). Turnovers continued to plague BYU, who finished with 7, including JD Falslev's mishandled kickoff return at their own 6-yard line, QB Jake Heaps fumble at their own 6-yard line, and QB Riley Nelson's (substituted in for Heaps in the 4th quarter) fumble after being sacked, returned 57 yards for a TD by freshman LB V.J. Fehoko.

The final result of 54–10 was the largest margin of victory for either team in the Holy War since 1983, and Utah's second-largest margin of victory ever in the Holy War. Utah's 54 points were the second most the Utes had ever scored against BYU.

==== 2012: Fandemonium and Several Chances ====
In 2012, the Holy War ended in dramatic and odd fashion. Utah went into the 4th quarter up 17 points, but the BYU offense brought the game within 3. With less than 30 seconds remaining, BYU quarterback Riley Nelson successfully drove into Utah territory on 4th and long with a 40-yard pass to wide receiver, Cody Hoffman. On what was thought to be the final play of the game, Nelson's deflected pass fell incomplete as time seemingly expired and the Utah fans rushed the field. The pass, however, was shown to hit the ground with one second left, giving BYU an opportunity to kick a field goal from 51 yards (once the fans had been cleared from the field of play). On the attempt, the kick was blocked, the ball recovered by BYU, and the runner subsequently tackled. However, Utah fans again rushed the field, this time before the play was over, thus earning a penalty that gave BYU another chance at a field goal, this one from 36 yards. That attempt was unsuccessful, however, when the kick hit the left upright and went awry, leading Utah fans, who were already on the sidelines, to rush the field for a third and final time. Utah won the game 24–21.

==== 2013: Twenty to Thirteen in 2013 ====
Utah and BYU played the 2013 game under the request of Utah Athletic Director Chris Hill that it would be the final contest until 2016 – a fact that served as motivation for both teams to avoid having to endure a defeat for three years.

Utah found themselves with a 13–0 halftime lead at LaVell Edwards Stadium. BYU scored on their first drive of the 2nd half, a field goal, with 11:39 remaining in the third quarter and the Cougars tacked on another exactly six minutes later. Utah, though, responded with a 79-yard touchdown drive to extend its lead to 20–6 with 12:44 remaining in regulation.

BYU fought back for their 3rd score of the half, this time on a one-yard run by running back Michael Alisa, with 5:44 left in the game to close the gap to seven points. After the Cougar defense forced the Utes to a three-and-out on Utah's next possession, BYU quarterback Taysom Hill was intercepted on the Cougars' next drive with a little more than 90 seconds remaining – appearing to seal the win for Utah.

The Utes left Provo with a 20–13 win.

==== 2015: Holy War in Sin City ====
I'm lucky enough to be one of the many players on the football team that actually has never lost to these bastards, which leads me to end and say this is Utah's world and BYU's living in it.

— Utah punter Tom Hackett, 2015

The planned hiatus for 2014–2015 was unexpectedly cut short. On December 6, 2015, it was announced that BYU would play Utah on December 19, 2015, in the Las Vegas Bowl. It was the first time the teams met in the postseason and the first Holy War game to be played at a neutral site.

During the first 8 minutes of the game, Utah forced a Las Vegas Bowl record five turnovers in the first quarter, resulting in a 35–0 lead. Though BYU scored four unanswered touchdowns to narrow the lead to 35–28, Utah was able to secure a crucial first down at the end of the game to run out the clock. After the first five minutes of the game, BYU never possessed the ball with a chance to tie or take the lead in the game. Utah took the bowl game with a 35–28 win, ending Bronco Mendenhall's last game as BYU's head coach with a loss.

=== 2016–2025: Whittingham versus Sitake ===
The next decade of the rivalry featured Kalani Sitake as the next Cougar head coach. Sitake had played for BYU, and was on the last team to have been coached by LaVell Edwards. This era of the series was noted for Sitake's longtime friendship with Utah coach Whittingham; Sitake had coached for the Utes under Whittingham from 2005–14, and even served as his defensive coordinator. BYU's teams under Sitake initially struggled in their games against Utah. With Whittingham continuing to build his program after finding their footing in the Pac-12, BYU faced a talent and recruiting disadvantage throughout the 2010s as an independent. Utah would extend their winning streak against the Cougars to 9 in 2019. However, BYU would close the aforementioned talent and recruiting gap upon accepting an invitation to join the Big 12 Conference in 2021. Following a mass exodus from the Pac-12 by most of its programs in 2023, Utah joined BYU in the Big 12, finally returning the rivalry to a shared conference. Sitake would finish this period by defeating his mentor three consecutive times to shift program momentum back in BYU's favor. Whittingham would ultimately conclude his Utah tenure with a 4–3 record against his friend and protegé.

==== 2016: Hindsight is 20–20 ====
The first BYU offensive play from scrimmage in the 2016 game resulted in an interception, returned by Sunia Tauteoli for a 41-yard Utah pick-six. However, Utah subsequently committed several turnovers, which lead to two BYU field goals and a touchdown late in the 2nd quarter. Utah answered with a touchdown of their own and held a slim 14–13 lead as the teams headed into the locker room for halftime. After adding a field goal in the third quarter and one in the fourth quarter, Utah led 20–13 with 2:47 to go. Taysom Hill led BYU on 75-yard drive, capped off by a 7-yard touchdown run with 18 seconds to play. Rather than kick the PAT to tie the game, Sitake elected to go for the two-point conversion and the win. Quarterback Taysom Hill was then stopped short of the goal line by the Ute defense. Utah emerged victorious by a score of 20–19, despite committing six turnovers in the game.

==== 2017: The Tyler Huntley Show ====
In the 2017 matchup, Utah quarterback Tyler Huntley racked up a career-high 300 passing yards (27-of-36) and added a career-high 89 yards on the ground and a touchdown. The Utes held a 13-point lead to end the third quarter, but a late fourth quarter touchdown from BYU made it a six-point game, putting the pressure on the Utes' defense. They didn't disappoint, forcing three incomplete passes to regain possession and claim the victory. Utah won the game, 19–13.

==== 2018: The Comeback ====
The game on November 24, 2018, was held in Salt Lake City at Rice-Eccles Stadium. BYU (6–5) was the underdog to the Pac-12 South Champion Utah Utes (8–3). BYU jumped on the Utes, scoring 20 unanswered points. Utah's first score came early in the third quarter from an interception returned for a touchdown. BYU led 27–7 up until 40 seconds remained in the third quarter. After a Utah touchdown, the resulting momentum shift led to two touchdown runs by Armand Shyne, which gave Utah the lead for the first time with just 3:02 left in regulation. Utah, up by 1 point (28–27), then forced BYU to turn the ball over on downs with an impressive 4th & 1 stop. On the first play of the ensuing drive, with 1:43 left in the game, Utah quarterback Jason Shelley ran 33 yards for a touchdown to bring the score to 35–27. This was the largest deficit overcome for either team in the Holy War series.

==== 2019: Moss Runs and Huntley Taunts ====
We never gonna lose to them. They... they so poo-poo.

— Utah QB Tyler Huntley, 2019

The 100th meeting between the two schools saw Utah winning their 4th straight game at LaVell Edwards Stadium with the help of senior running back Zack Moss, who rushed for 187 yards and scored a touchdown. Utah won the game, 30–12, and extended their winning streak over BYU to 9 games.

==== 2021: End of the Streak ====
The Cougars and Utes did not meet in the 2020 season as a result of the COVID-19 pandemic and next met on September 11, 2021, in Provo, a day after BYU accepted an invitation to play in the Big 12 Conference starting in 2023. The 21st-ranked Utes faltered early offensively, turning the ball over twice in the first quarter. BYU capitalized and controlled the trenches for a large majority of the game, eventually building a 23–7 lead to begin the fourth quarter. The Utes attempted to mount a comeback, cutting the deficit to six after a touchdown with 9:31 remaining, but BYU wore them down late, kicking a field goal with 3:17 left to put them up 26–17. After the Utes did not convert on 4th down on their ensuing possession, BYU ran out the clock. As time expired, BYU fans rushed out on the field to celebrate. The upset victory for BYU ended their nine-game losing streak and marked their first win over Utah since 2009, and Sitake's first win over Utah (and his friend and mentor Whittingham) as BYU head coach. BYU quarterback Jaren Hall accounted for over 200 total yards with three passing touchdowns in the win, and the Cougars rushed for 231 yards; this was particularly notable as it came against a Ute defense that had often stifled their running game in the decade past.

==== 2024: First Big-12 matchup ====
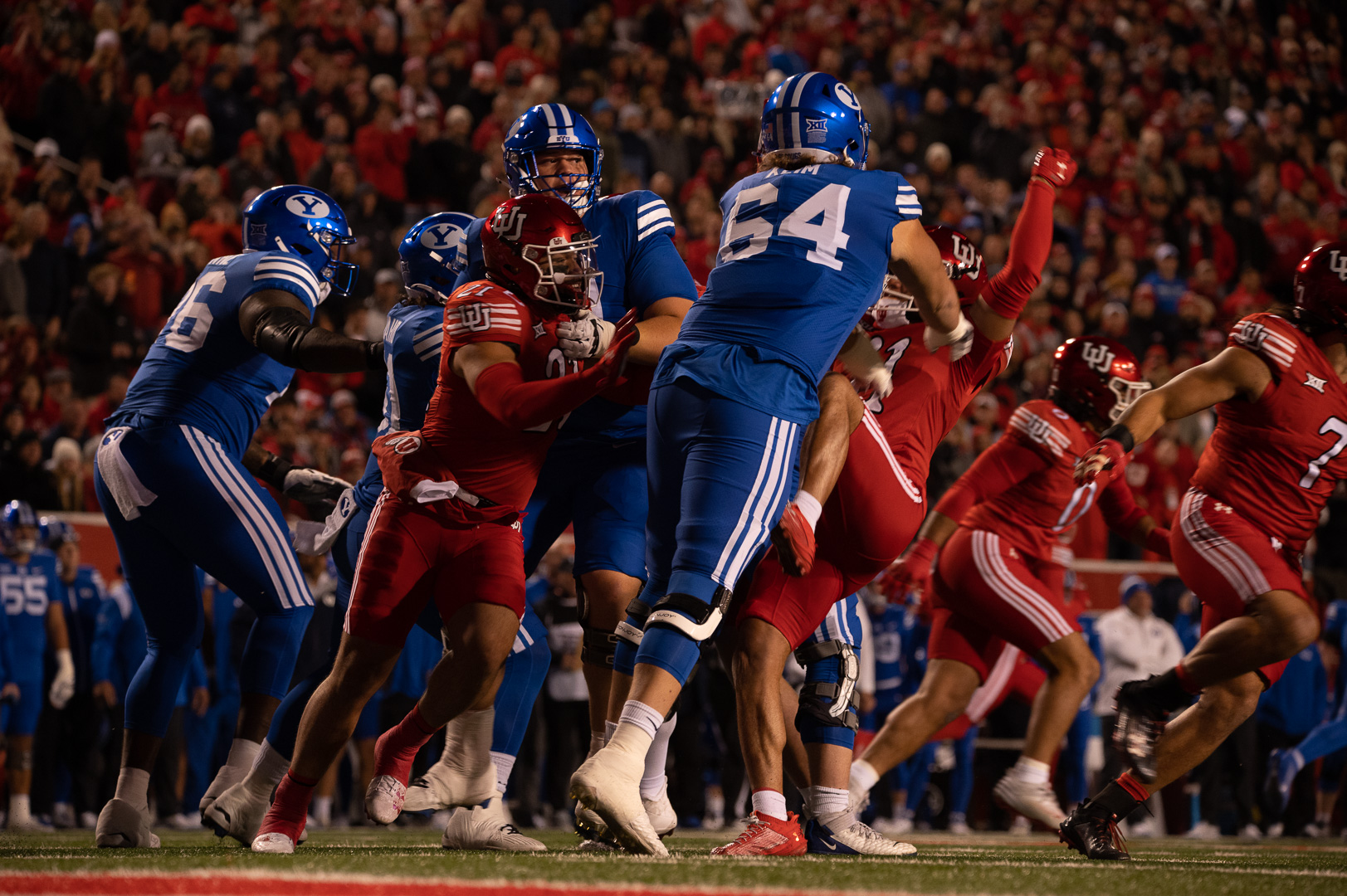
The 2024 game at Rice–Eccles Stadium

After a two-year hiatus, the Cougars and Utes next met on November 9, 2024 in Salt Lake City. Both teams had since joined the Big 12 Conference. It was their first time playing as conference foes since 2010. BYU came into the game undefeated (8–0) and ranked 9th in the nation, while Utah (4–4) was struggling to end a four-game losing streak.

The Cougars and Utes traded scores early in the first half, with BYU taking a 10–7 lead on a 96-yard kickoff return for a touchdown. However, the Ute offense, led by new starting quarterback Brandon Rose, took control leading into halftime, taking a 21–10 lead at the break. The Utes' high-ranking defense largely suffocated BYU's offense for much of the game. But Utah's offense stalled often after halftime and was shut out in the second half. The Cougars took advantage and cut the deficit to 21–19 early in the fourth quarter. With under two minutes remaining, the Utes unleashed a ferocious pass rush on BYU's final drive that resulted in a 4th-down sack of Cougar quarterback Jake Retzlaff on his own 1-yard line, seemingly sealing the upset win for Utah. However, a defensive holding penalty was called on Ute cornerback Zemaiah Vaughn, giving BYU an automatic first down and extending their drive. Retzlaff then drove the Cougars 65 yards to the Utah 26, winding down the clock, allowing kicker Will Ferrin to convert a go-ahead 44-yard field goal with 4 seconds remaining, putting BYU in the lead 22–21. BYU promptly forced and recovered a Utah fumble on the ensuing kickoff to end the game and complete the comeback, their first victory in Salt Lake since 2006.

==== 2025: Bear on the Loose ====
Going into the 2025 matchup, BYU was unbeaten (6–0) and ranked 15th in the country. Utah (5–1) was also ranked (23rd), which marked the first time since 2009 that both teams were ranked in the AP Top 25 for the Holy War. Additionally, the national pregame show Big Noon Kickoff was hosted in Provo for the first time in the rivalry's history.

Utah, led by new starting quarterback Devon Dampier, outgained the Cougars by over 100 yards, including rushing for 226 yards. However, miscues and failures to capitalize on opportunities plagued the Utes all night; they turned the ball over twice and were penalized 12 times for 77 yards. BYU responded with a strong ground game of their own; they rushed for 202 yards, led by running back LJ Martin and true freshman signal-caller Bear Bachmeier. Despite both teams' general success moving the football (both averaged over 5 yards per play), both teams' defenses also kept the opposition out of the end zone for much of the night, with BYU holding a 10–7 lead after three quarters. After the Utes took their first lead of the game (14–10) early in the fourth, BYU scored two consecutive touchdowns to regain a 24–14 lead, punctuated by a 22-yard touchdown run by Bachmeier. Bachmeier's touchdown was noted for him evading eight different Utah defenders, as well as dragging two into the end zone. The physical nature of the play prompted FOX Sports commentator Jason Benetti to exclaim, "There's a Bear on the loose in Provo!" The Utes scored late to cut the deficit to three, but failed to convert an onside kick, securing a 24–21 victory for BYU.

=== 2026–present: Sitake versus Scalley ===
In December 2025, Whittingham announced he was stepping down after 21 seasons coaching the Utes, making way for longtime defensive coordinator and former Ute safety Morgan Scalley to take the reins after previously being designated the head coach-in-waiting. Whittingham would go on to take the head coaching position at Michigan in the weeks following. In response to the rivalry's history with animosity, Scalley began his tenure with an emphasis on the need for more respect between the programs. He acknowledged his own past hostile comments towards BYU as a player and reflected on the change in his perspective, stating "It's mine and Kalani [Sitake]'s hope that this thing can be more civil...[t]he hatred, the toxicity that is spewed from both sides, to me it's not good for the rivalry. What makes it great is it's competitive, it's the back and forth."

====== 2026: First Top-10 game ======
The next entry in the Holy War was arguably the biggest in the rivalry's history yet. It marked the first time that both BYU and Utah were ranked in the Top 10, with the Utes coming in undefeated (8–0) and ranked 3rd in the College Football Playoff Top 25, and BYU (7–1) ranked 9th. The game also carried massive implications for both the College Football Playoff and the Big 12 title race, as BYU needed a win to stay alive in both.

Utah got off to a fast start; their offense blitzed the Cougar defense early to race out to a 14–0 lead in the game's first five minutes. BYU later settled in and fiercely responded, forcing 2 Ute turnovers and scoring 20 unanswered points to take a 20–14 halftime lead. After the back-and-forth first half, however, the Utes made drastic defensive adjustments and punished Cougar quarterback Bear Bachmeier into four interceptions later in the game. The turnovers completely shifted the momentum back in Utah's favor, as they held BYU scoreless in the second half. Ute quarterback Devon Dampier would end up leading two late touchdown drives to cap off a four-touchdown day (2 passing, 2 rushing) and the 28–20 comeback win for Utah. It was Utah's first win over BYU since 2019, and Scalley's first as head coach against his rival. It also propelled their chances to win the Big 12 and make the College Football Playoff.

== Future games ==
In November 2023, it was announced that the matchup would be one of four in the Big 12 played on an annual basis through at least 2027.

== Game results ==
BYU victories	Utah victories	Tie games

No.	Date	Location	Winner	Score
1	April 6, 1896	Salt Lake City	Utah	12–4
2	November 14, 1896	Salt Lake City	Utah	6–0
3	December 5, 1896	Provo	BYA	8–6
4	December 4, 1897	Salt Lake City	BYA	14–0
5	December 18, 1897	Provo	BYA	22–0
6	November 24, 1898	Salt Lake City	Utah	5–0
7	October 14, 1922	Salt Lake City	Utah	49–0
8	October 27, 1923	Provo	Utah	15–0
9	October 25, 1924	Salt Lake City	Utah	35–6
10	October 31, 1925	Provo	Utah	27–0
11	November 13, 1926	Salt Lake City	Utah	40–7
12	November 12, 1927	Provo	Utah	20–0
13	November 17, 1928	Salt Lake City	Tie	0–0
14	November 2, 1929	Salt Lake City	Utah	45–13
15	October 18, 1930	Salt Lake City	Utah	34–7
16	October 17, 1931	Salt Lake City	Utah	43–0
17	October 15, 1932	Salt Lake City	Utah	29–0
18	October 14, 1933	Salt Lake City	Utah	21–6
19	October 13, 1934	Salt Lake City	Utah	43–0
20	November 2, 1935	Provo	Utah	32–0
21	October 31, 1936	Salt Lake City	Utah	18–0
22	October 2, 1937	Salt Lake City	Utah	14–0
23	October 15, 1938	Salt Lake City	Tie	7–7
24	October 14, 1939	Provo	Utah	35–13
25	October 5, 1940	Salt Lake City	Utah	12–6
26	October 18, 1941	Salt Lake City	Tie	6–6
27	October 10, 1942	Salt Lake City	BYU	12–7
28	October 12, 1946	Provo	Utah	35–6
29	October 11, 1947	Salt Lake City	Utah	28–6
30	October 9, 1948	Provo	Utah	30–0
31	October 8, 1949	Salt Lake City	Utah	38–0
32	October 7, 1950	Provo	Tie	28–28
33	October 6, 1951	Salt Lake City	Utah	7–6
34	October 11, 1952	Salt Lake City	Utah	34–6
35	November 26, 1953	Salt Lake City	Utah	33–32
36	October 9, 1954	Provo	Utah	12–7
37	October 8, 1955	Salt Lake City	Utah	41–9
38	October 5, 1956	Provo	Utah	41–6
39	October 12, 1957	Salt Lake City	Utah	27–0
40	September 27, 1958	Salt Lake City	BYU	41–6
41	October 9, 1959	Salt Lake City	Utah	20–8
42	October 7, 1960	Salt Lake City	Utah	17–0
43	October 14, 1961	Salt Lake City	Utah	21–20
44	October 13, 1962	Salt Lake City	Utah	35–20
45	October 12, 1963	Salt Lake City	Utah	15–6
46	November 7, 1964	Salt Lake City	Utah	47–13
47	November 6, 1965	Provo	BYU	25–20
48	November 12, 1966	Salt Lake City	BYU	35–13
49	October 28, 1967	Provo	BYU	17–13
50	November 2, 1968	Salt Lake City	Utah	30–21
51	November 22, 1969	Provo	Utah	16–6
52	November 21, 1970	Salt Lake City	Utah	14–13
53	November 20, 1971	Provo	Utah	17–15

No.	Date	Location	Winner	Score
54	November 18, 1972	Salt Lake City	BYU	16–7
55	November 24, 1973	Salt Lake City	BYU	46–22
56	November 23, 1974	Provo	BYU	48–20
57	November 15, 1975	Provo	BYU	51–20
58	November 20, 1976	Salt Lake City	BYU	34–12
59	November 5, 1977	Provo	#14 BYU	38–8
60	November 18, 1978	Salt Lake City	Utah	23–22
61	November 17, 1979	Provo	#10 BYU	27–0
62	November 22, 1980	Salt Lake City	#13 BYU	56–6
63	November 21, 1981	Provo	#18 BYU	56–28
64	November 20, 1982	Salt Lake City	BYU	17–12
65	November 19, 1983	Provo	#9 BYU	55–7
66	November 17, 1984	Salt Lake City	#3 BYU	24–14
67	November 23, 1985	Provo	#11 BYU	38–28
68	November 22, 1986	Salt Lake City	BYU	35–21
69	November 21, 1987	Provo	BYU	21–18
70	November 19, 1988	Salt Lake City	Utah	57–28
71	November 18, 1989	Provo	#21 BYU	70–31
72	November 17, 1990	Salt Lake City	#5 BYU	45–22
73	November 23, 1991	Provo	BYU	48–17
74	November 21, 1992	Salt Lake City	BYU	31–22
75	November 20, 1993	Provo	Utah	34–31
76	November 19, 1994	Salt Lake City	#21 Utah	34–31
77	November 18, 1995	Provo	Utah	34–17
78	November 23, 1996	Salt Lake City	#8 BYU	37–17
79	November 22, 1997	Provo	Utah	20–14
80	November 21, 1998	Salt Lake City	BYU	26–24
81	November 20, 1999	Provo	Utah	20–17
82	November 24, 2000	Salt Lake City	BYU	34–27
83	November 17, 2001	Provo	#8 BYU	24–21
84	November 23, 2002	Salt Lake City	Utah	13–6
85	November 22, 2003	Provo	Utah	3–0
86	November 20, 2004	Salt Lake City	#5 Utah	52–21
87	November 19, 2005	Provo	Utah	41–34^{OT}
88	November 25, 2006	Salt Lake City	#21 BYU	33–31
89	November 24, 2007	Provo	#23 BYU	17–10
90	November 22, 2008	Salt Lake City	#8 Utah	48–24
91	November 28, 2009	Provo	#18 BYU	26–23^{OT}
92	November 27, 2010	Salt Lake City	#23 Utah	17–16
93	September 17, 2011	Provo	Utah	54–10
94	September 15, 2012	Salt Lake City	Utah	24–21
95	September 21, 2013	Provo	Utah	20–13
96	December 19, 2015	Las Vegas, Nevada	#20 Utah	35–28
97	September 10, 2016	Salt Lake City	Utah	20–19
98	September 9, 2017	Provo	Utah	19–13
99	November 24, 2018	Salt Lake City	#18 Utah	35–27
100	August 29, 2019	Provo	#14 Utah	30–12
101	September 11, 2021	Provo	BYU	26–17
102	November 9, 2024	Salt Lake City	#9 BYU	22–21
103	October 18, 2025	Provo	#15 BYU	24–21
104	November 7, 2026	Salt Lake City	#3 Utah	28–20
Series: Utah leads 63–37–4
BYU was known as Brigham Young Academy (BYA) until 1903

=== Results by location ===
As of November 7, 2026:

State	City	Games	BYU victories	Utah victories	Ties	Years played
Utah	Salt Lake City	62	18	41	3	1896–present
Utah	Provo	41	19	21	1	1923–27, 1935–39, 1946–56, 1896–97, 1965–present
Nevada	Las Vegas	1	0	1	0	2015

== See also ==
- BYU–Utah rivalry
- List of NCAA college football rivalry games
