= 1977 Utah Utes football team =

American college football season

1977 Utah Utes football
- Conference: Western Athletic Conference
- Record: 3–8 (2–5 WAC)
- Head coach: Wayne Howard (1st season)
- Offensive coordinator: Ron McBride (1st season)
- Defensive coordinator: Tom Gadd (1st season)
- Home stadium: Robert Rice Stadium

1977 Western Athletic Conference football standings
	Conf.					Overall
Team	W		L		T	W		L		T
No. 20 BYU +	6	–	1	–	0	9	–	2	–	0
No. 18 Arizona State +	6	–	1	–	0	9	–	3	–	0
Colorado State	5	–	2	–	0	9	–	2	–	1
Wyoming	4	–	3	–	0	4	–	6	–	1
Arizona	3	–	4	–	0	5	–	7	–	0
New Mexico	2	–	5	–	0	5	–	7	–	0
Utah	2	–	5	–	0	3	–	8	–	0
UTEP	0	–	7	–	0	1	–	10	–	0
+ – Conference co-champions; Rankings from AP Poll

The 1977 Utah Utes football team was an American football team that represented the University of Utah as a member of the Western Athletic Conference (WAC) during the 1977 NCAA Division I football season. In their first season under head coach Wayne Howard, the Utes compiled an overall record of 3–8 with a mark of 2–5 against conference opponents, placing fourth in the WAC. Home games were played on campus at Robert Rice Stadium in Salt Lake City.

== Schedule ==
Date	Time	Opponent	Site	Result	Attendance	Source
September 17	1:30 pm	at No. 5 Oklahoma*	Oklahoma Memorial Stadium; Norman, OK	L 24–62	71,184	
September 24	7:30 pm	No. 19 Houston*	Robert Rice Stadium; Salt Lake City, UT	L 16–34	26,232	
October 1	1:30 pm	at Colorado State	Hughes Stadium; Fort Collins, CO	L 3–44	23,401	
October 8	7:30 pm	Wyoming	Robert Rice Stadium; Salt Lake City, UT	W 23–13	26,428	
October 15	1:30 pm	Utah State*	Robert Rice Stadium; Salt Lake City, UT (rivalry)	W 20–0	25,438	
October 22	8:30 pm	at Arizona	Arizona Stadium; Tucson, AZ	L 17–45	43,500	
October 29	1:30 pm	Arizona State	Robert Rice Stadium; Salt Lake City, UT	L 19–47	16,528	
November 5	1:30 pm	at No. 14 BYU	Cougar Stadium; Provo, UT (rivalry)	L 8–38	34,208	
November 12	1:30 pm	UTEP^{†}	Robert Rice Stadium; Salt Lake City, UT	W 29–17	18,122	
November 19	12:00 pm	at Florida*	Florida Field; Gainesville, FL	L 29–38	56,055	
November 26	7:30 pm	at New Mexico	University Stadium; Albuquerque, NM	L 24–41	8,296	
*Non-conference game; ^{†}Homecoming; Rankings from AP Poll released prior to the game; All times are in Mountain time

== Game summaries ==
=== Utah State ===
Team	1	2	3	4	Total
Utah State	0	0	0	0	0
• Utah	0	3	9	8	20

- Date: October 15
- Location: Robert Rice Stadium, Salt Lake City
- Game attendance: 25,438

Scoring summary
2	UTAH	McNamara 29-yard field goal	UTAH 3-0
3	UTAH	Kurz 8-yard pass from Gomez (kick failed)	UTAH 9-0
3	UTAH	McNamara 50-yard field goal	UTAH 12-0
4	UTAH	Peake 4-yard run (Gomez run)	UTAH 20-0

Utah recorded its first shutout in seven years.

== Roster ==
1977 Utah Utes football team roster
Players			Coaches
Offense: Pos. / # / Name / Class; WR / 43 / Jack Steptoe / Sr	Defense: Pos. / # / Name / Class; DB / 1 / Jeff Griffin / Fr	Special teams: Pos. / # / Name / Class; P / 19 / Rick Partridge / Jr	Head coach: Wayne Howard; Coordinators/assistant coaches Legend: (C) Team captain; (S) Suspended; (I) Ineligible; Injured; Redshirt
