= 1977 UTEP Miners football team =

American college football season

1977 UTEP Miners football
- Conference: Western Athletic Conference
- Record: 1–10 (0–7 WAC)
- Head coach: Bill Michael (1st season)
- Home stadium: Sun Bowl

1977 Western Athletic Conference football standings
	Conf.					Overall
Team	W		L		T	W		L		T
No. 20 BYU +	6	–	1	–	0	9	–	2	–	0
No. 18 Arizona State +	6	–	1	–	0	9	–	3	–	0
Colorado State	5	–	2	–	0	9	–	2	–	1
Wyoming	4	–	3	–	0	4	–	6	–	1
Arizona	3	–	4	–	0	5	–	7	–	0
New Mexico	2	–	5	–	0	5	–	7	–	0
Utah	2	–	5	–	0	3	–	8	–	0
UTEP	0	–	7	–	0	1	–	10	–	0
+ – Conference co-champions; Rankings from AP Poll

The 1977 UTEP Miners football team was an American football team that represented the University of Texas at El Paso in the Western Athletic Conference during the 1977 NCAA Division I football season. In their first year under head coach Bill Michael, the team compiled a 1–10 record.

== Schedule ==
Date	Opponent	Site	Result	Attendance	Source
September 10	North Texas State*	Sun Bowl; El Paso, TX	L 10–41	18,750	
September 17	at Wyoming	War Memorial Stadium; Laramie, WY	L 17–27	20,933	
September 24	at Oklahoma State*	Lewis Field; Stillwater, OK	L 0–54	39,000	
October 1	New Mexico State*^{†}	Sun Bowl; El Paso, TX (rivalry)	W 23–21	22,375	
October 8	Colorado State	Sun Bowl; El Paso, TX	L 31–40	16,950	
October 15	at San Diego State*	San Diego Stadium; San Diego, CA	L 7–49	34,760	
October 22	at Arizona State	Sun Devil Stadium; Tempe, AZ	L 3–66	55,446	
November 5	at New Mexico	University Stadium; Albuquerque, NM	L 17–33	17,081	
November 12	at Utah	Robert Rice Stadium; Salt Lake City, UT	L 17–29	18,122	
November 19	Arizona	Sun Bowl; El Paso, TX	L 24–41	7,100	
November 26	No. 18 BYU	Sun Bowl; El Paso, TX	L 19–68	7,800	
*Non-conference game; ^{†}Homecoming; Rankings from AP Poll released prior to the game
