= 1977 Arizona Wildcats football team =

American college football season

1977 Arizona Wildcats football
- Conference: Western Athletic Conference
- Record: 5–7 (3–4 WAC)
- Head coach: Tony Mason (1st season)
- Home stadium: Arizona Stadium

1977 Western Athletic Conference football standings
	Conf.					Overall
Team	W		L		T	W		L		T
No. 20 BYU +	6	–	1	–	0	9	–	2	–	0
No. 18 Arizona State +	6	–	1	–	0	9	–	3	–	0
Colorado State	5	–	2	–	0	9	–	2	–	1
Wyoming	4	–	3	–	0	4	–	6	–	1
Arizona	3	–	4	–	0	5	–	7	–	0
New Mexico	2	–	5	–	0	5	–	7	–	0
Utah	2	–	5	–	0	3	–	8	–	0
UTEP	0	–	7	–	0	1	–	10	–	0
+ – Conference co-champions; Rankings from AP Poll

The 1977 Arizona Wildcats football team represented the University of Arizona in the Western Athletic Conference (WAC) during the 1977 NCAA Division I football season. In their first season under head coach Tony Mason, the Wildcats compiled a 5–7 record (3–4 against WAC opponents), finished in fifth place in the WAC, and outscored their opponents, 256 to 250. The team played its home games in Arizona Stadium in Tucson, Arizona. This was Arizona’s (and rival Arizona State’s) final season as members of the WAC and joined the Pac-8 Conference, which became the Pac-10, in the following season.

Mason replaced Jim Young, who left for Purdue after the 1976 season ended.

The team's statistical leaders included Marc Lunsford with 1,344 passing yards, Derriak Anderson with 568 rushing yards, and Harry Holt with 423 receiving yards. Linebacker Corky Ingraham led the team with 153 total tackles.

== Before the season ==
Arizona concluded the 1976 season with a record of 5–6 (3–4 in WAC). Young accepted the head coaching position at Purdue afterwards, and Mason was chosen to be his successor. Mason, who coached at Cincinnati, came to Arizona to rebuild the program and promised to return the team to its winning ways.

== Schedule ==
Date	Opponent	Site	Result	Attendance	Source
September 10	at Auburn*	Jordan-Hare Stadium; Auburn, AL	L 10–21	45,000	
September 17	San Diego State*	Arizona Stadium; Tucson, AZ	L 14–21	42,135	
September 24	at Iowa*	Kinnick Stadium; Iowa City, IA	W 41–7	53,110	
October 1	at Wyoming	War Memorial Stadium; Laramie, WY	L 12–13	25,133	
October 8	Texas Tech*	Arizona Stadium; Tucson, AZ	L 26–32	41,500	
October 22	Utah	Arizona Stadium; Tucson, AZ	W 45–17	43,500	
October 29	at BYU	Cougar Stadium; Provo, UT	L 14–34	33,621	
November 5	Colorado State	Arizona Stadium; Tucson, AZ	L 14–35	41,016	
November 12	New Mexico	Arizona Stadium; Tucson, AZ (rivalry)	W 15–13	40,500	
November 19	at UTEP	Sun Bowl; El Paso, TX	W 41–24	7,100	
November 26	at Arizona State	Sun Devil Stadium; Tempe, AZ (rivalry)	L 7–23	56,326	
December 3	at Hawaii*	Aloha Stadium; Halawa, HI	W 17–10	30,994	
*Non-conference game

== Game summaries ==
=== Auburn ===
For the second year in a row, Arizona opened the season against Auburn. It was also their first visit to an SEC team’s home stadium. In Mason’s first game as Arizona coach, the Wildcats started slow and never recovered as the Tigers got the victory. As of 2021, both Arizona and Auburn have not played each other since.

=== Iowa ===
Arizona traveled to Iowa to take on the Hawkeyes. The Wildcats got their offense going and Mason captured his first win as Wildcat coach.

=== New Mexico ===
The Wildcats faced New Mexico in their home finale. Arizona’s offense struggled at times but was able to get past the Lobos and the Kit Carson Rifle returned back to Tucson for the first time since 1974. This turned out to be Mason’s only meeting against New Mexico. It was also the last meeting between the Wildcats and Lobos until 1987 (due to Arizona leaving the WAC). As a result, the two schools would no longer play annually as rivals.

=== Arizona State ===
In Mason's debut against Arizona State, the Wildcats were unable to overcome Arizona State and its home crowd and lost to the Sun Devils for the third straight year. This was the final WAC game played by the two teams.

=== Hawaii ===
The Wildcats played a twelfth game of the season due to non-conference scheduling. They traveled to Hawaii in their season finale. Both Arizona and Hawaii’s defense shut down the offense and led to a low-scoring game. In the end, the Wildcats came out victorious. Coincidentally, Hawaii was coached by Dick Tomey, a future Arizona coach who would have a successful tenure with the Wildcats.

== Season notes ==
- Arizona seemed to have struggled for wins for most of the season. After Young departed for Purdue, the Wildcats may have been affected by the absence of his leadership and that Mason could not duplicate his success, which led to the team losing six of their first eight games, though they recovered to win three of the final four games.
- This was the last season that Arizona played in the WAC before moving to the Pac-10. In addition, this was also the last year that Arizona and New Mexico played an annual rivalry series together as conference opponents. The Wildcats defeated the Lobos in this season to reclaim the Kit Carson Rifle, the rivalry’s trophy. The rifle was eventually retired in 1997. New Mexico remained in the WAC until 1999 when then joined the Mountain West Conference. The win over New Mexico was the Arizona’s first over a rival since 1974, when they defeated Arizona State.
- This was the first season that Arizona played twelve regular-season games. This feat would not occur again until 1998.
- After losing to San Diego State, the Wildcats would not lose to them at home again until 2021, which would also be a home opener for Arizona.
- In three of Arizona’s five wins, they scored more than 40 points.

== Personnel ==
1977 Arizona Wildcats football team roster
Players			Coaches
Offense: Pos. / # / Name / Class	Defense: Pos. / # / Name / Class	Special teams: Pos. / # / Name / Class; K / / Lee Pistor	Head coach: Tony Mason; Coordinators/assistant coaches: Tom Roggeman; Legend: (C) Team captain; (S) Suspended; (I) Ineligible; Injured; Redshirt
