= Wayne Howard (American football) =

American football coach (born 1931)

Biographical details
- Born: April 30, 1931 (age 95)

Coaching career (HC unless noted)
- 1959–1965: Abraham Lincoln HS (CA)
- 1966–1971: Gavilan
- 1972–1973: UC Riverside
- 1974–1976: Long Beach State
- 1977–1981: Utah
- 1982–1983: Long Beach

Head coaching record
- Overall: 70–37–2 (college); 46–28–1 (junior college); 45–15–3 (high school)
- Tournaments: 0–1 (California JC small division playoffs)

Accomplishments and honors

Championships
- 2 Coast Conference (1968, 1970)

Awards
- WAC Coach of the Year (1978)

Wayne Howard (born April 30, 1931) is an American former football coach. He served as the head football coach at the University of California, Riverside from 1972 to 1973, California State University, Long Beach from 1974 to 1976, and the University of Utah from 1977 to 1981, compiling career college football head coaching record of 70–37–2. Howard is also the head football coach at Gavilan College in Gilroy, California from 1966 to 1971 and Long Beach City College (LBCC) from 1982 to 1983, tallying a career junior college football head coaching record of 46–28–1.

== Early life ==
A native of Denver, Howard attended Jordan High School in Long Beach, California before transferring in his senior year to Chaffey High School in Ontario, California, from which he graduated in 1948. He played college baseball at the University of Redlands in Redlands, California, graduating in 1957 with a Bachelor of Arts degree. His time at Redlands was interrupted by five years of military service as a flying officer in the United States Air Force.

== Coaching career ==
Utah lured Howard away from Long Beach State after three winning seasons as head coach there. During his five seasons at Utah, his winning percentage of .554 was better than that of his predecessor, Tom Lovat (.152), and his successor, Chuck Stobart (.489).

His final season at Utah, Howard had the Utes in contention to win the Western Athletic Conference championship, needing to win the final game against BYU to take the title. He retired after losing to BYU, but he was not clear why. He later said, "I just did. No real reason. I wasn't unhappy. I was not treated badly. I really never tried to get another job. I liked it there. They treated me well."

=== BYU rivalry ===
During the BYU game in 1977, BYU head coach LaVell Edwards put starting quarterback Marc Wilson back into the game with two minutes remaining so that Wilson could set a then NCAA record for 571 passing yards in a game. BYU won 38–8. After the game, Howard said, "This today will be inspiring. The hatred between BYU and Utah is nothing compared to what it will be. It will be a crusade to beat BYU from now on. This is a prediction: in the next two years Utah will drill BYU someday, but we won’t run up the score even if we could set an NCAA record against them." The next year Howard made good on his promise, upsetting BYU 23–22.

In an interview after retiring, Howard hinted that he did not like aspects of the BYU rivalry. "There's too much religion involved," he said referring to the fact that the Church of Jesus Christ of Latter-day Saints owns BYU, and many fans of the two schools inject religion into the rivalry. "I did not like that. I really didn't.

== Head coaching record ==
=== College ===
Year	Team	Overall	Conference	Standing	Bowl/playoffs
UC Riverside Highlanders (California Collegiate Athletic Association) (1972–1973)
1972	UC Riverside	9–1	3–0	1st	
1973	UC Riverside	8–2	3–1	2nd	
UC Riverside:		17–3	5–1		
Long Beach State 49ers (Pacific Coast Athletic Association) (1974–1976)
1974	Long Beach State	6–5	1–3	T–4th	
1975	Long Beach State	9–2	4–1	2nd	
1976	Long Beach State	8–3	2–2	3rd	
Long Beach State:		23–10	7–6		
Utah Utes (Western Athletic Conference) (1977–1981)
1977	Utah	3–8	2–5	T–6th	
1978	Utah	8–3	4–2	T–2nd	
1979	Utah	6–6	5–2	2nd	
1980	Utah	5–5–1	2–3–1	7th	
1981	Utah	8–2–1	4–1–1	T–3rd	
Utah:		30–24–2	17–13–2		
Total:		70–37–2			
National championship Conference title Conference division title or championship game berth

=== Junior college football ===
Year	Team	Overall	Conference	Standing	Bowl/playoffs
Gavilan Rams (Coast Conference) (1966–1971)
1966	Gavilan	2–7	2–5	T–5th	
1967	Gavilan	5–4	4–4	T–4th	
1968	Gavilan	8–1	4–1	T–1st	
1969	Gavilan	6–3	3–2	3rd	
1970	Gavilan	9–1	5–0	2nd	L California JC small division semifinal
1971	Gavilan	7–2	4–1	2nd	
Gavilan:		37–18	22–13		
Long Beach Vikings (Metropolitan Conference) (1982–1983)
1982	Long Beach	4–5–1			
1983	Long Beach	5–5	3–2	T–2nd	
Long Beach:		9–10–1			
Total:		46–28–1			
National championship Conference title Conference division title or championship game berth
