= 1977 New Mexico Lobos football team =

American college football season

1977 New Mexico Lobos football
- Conference: Western Athletic Conference
- Record: 5–7 (2–5 WAC)
- Head coach: Bill Mondt (4th season)
- Home stadium: University Stadium

1977 Western Athletic Conference football standings
| | Conf. | | | | | Overall |
| Team | W | | L | | T | W | | L | | T |
|---|---|---|---|---|---|---|---|---|---|---|
| No. 20 BYU + | 6 | – | 1 | – | 0 | 9 | – | 2 | – | 0 |
| No. 18 Arizona State + | 6 | – | 1 | – | 0 | 9 | – | 3 | – | 0 |
| Colorado State | 5 | – | 2 | – | 0 | 9 | – | 2 | – | 1 |
| Wyoming | 4 | – | 3 | – | 0 | 4 | – | 6 | – | 1 |
| Arizona | 3 | – | 4 | – | 0 | 5 | – | 7 | – | 0 |
| New Mexico | 2 | – | 5 | – | 0 | 5 | – | 7 | – | 0 |
| Utah | 2 | – | 5 | – | 0 | 3 | – | 8 | – | 0 |
| UTEP | 0 | – | 7 | – | 0 | 1 | – | 10 | – | 0 |
+ – Conference co-champions; Rankings from AP Poll

The 1977 New Mexico Lobos football team was an American football team that represented the University of New Mexico in the Western Athletic Conference (WAC) during the 1977 NCAA Division I football season. In their fourth season under head coach Bill Mondt, the Lobos compiled a 5–7 record (2–5 against WAC opponents) and were outscored by a total of 319 to 272.

Preston Dennard, Jake Gonzales, Smokey Turman, and Marion Chapman were the team captains. The team's statistical leaders included Noel Mazzone with 1,085 passing yards, Mike Williams with 1,096 rushing yards, Preston Dennard with 341 receiving yards, and Jim Haynes with 43 points scored.

== Schedule ==
| Date | Opponent | Site | Result | Attendance | Source |
|---|---|---|---|---|---|
| September 10 | at Hawaii* | Aloha Stadium; Halawa, HI | W 35–26 | 26,532 | |
| September 17 | at No. 8 Texas Tech* | Jones Stadium; Lubbock, TX | L 14–49 | 45,108 | |
| September 24 | at No. 8 Colorado* | Folsom Field; Boulder, CO | L 7–42 | 47,152 | |
| September 30 | at No. 15 BYU | Cougar Stadium; Provo, UT | L 19–54 | 33,352 | |
| October 8 | Arizona State | University Stadium; Albuquerque, NM | L 24–45 | 22,310 | |
| October 15 | Wichita State*^{†} | University Stadium; Albuquerque, NM | W 22–17 | 22,069 | |
| October 22 | at Colorado State | Lubick Field; Fort Collins, CO | L 9–14 | 21,204 | |
| October 29 | at New Mexico State* | Memorial Stadium; Las Cruces, NM (rivalry) | W 35–13 | 14,250 | |
| November 5 | UTEP | University Stadium; Albuquerque, NM | W 33–17 | 17,081 | |
| November 12 | at Arizona | Arizona Stadium; Tucson, AZ (rivalry) | L 13–15 | 40,500 | |
| November 19 | Wyoming | University Stadium; Albuquerque, NM | L 21–23 | 9,550 | |
| November 26 | Utah | University Stadium; Albuquerque, NM | W 41–24 | 8,296 | |
*Non-conference game; ^{†}Homecoming; Rankings from AP Poll released prior to the game
