= 1977 Colorado State Rams football team =

American college football season

1977 Colorado State Rams football
- Conference: Western Athletic Conference
- Record: 9–2–1 (5–2 WAC)
- Head coach: Sark Arslanian (5th season)
- Offensive coordinator: Charles Armey (1st season)
- Defensive coordinator: Scott Henington (1st season)
- Home stadium: Hughes Stadium

1977 Western Athletic Conference football standings
	Conf.					Overall
Team	W		L		T	W		L		T
No. 20 BYU +	6	–	1	–	0	9	–	2	–	0
No. 18 Arizona State +	6	–	1	–	0	9	–	3	–	0
Colorado State	5	–	2	–	0	9	–	2	–	1
Wyoming	4	–	3	–	0	4	–	6	–	1
Arizona	3	–	4	–	0	5	–	7	–	0
New Mexico	2	–	5	–	0	5	–	7	–	0
Utah	2	–	5	–	0	3	–	8	–	0
UTEP	0	–	7	–	0	1	–	10	–	0
+ – Conference co-champions; Rankings from AP Poll

The 1977 Colorado State Rams football team was an American football team that represented Colorado State University in the Western Athletic Conference (WAC) during the 1977 NCAA Division I football season. In its fifth season under head coach Sark Arslanian, the team compiled a 9–2–1 record (5–2 against WAC opponents).

== Schedule ==
Date	Opponent	Site	Result	Attendance	Source
September 10	at Pacific (CA)*	Pacific Memorial Stadium; Stockton, CA	W 20–3	14,682	
September 17	at Hawaii*	Aloha Stadium; Halawa, HI	W 20–16	26,193	
September 24	Northern Colorado*	Hughes Stadium; Fort Collins, CO	W 48–10	28,605	
October 1	Utah	Hughes Stadium; Fort Collins, CO	W 44–3	23,401	
October 8	at UTEP	Sun Bowl; El Paso, TX	W 31–14	16,950	
October 15	BYU	Hughes Stadium; Fort Collins, CO	L 17–63	29,110	
October 22	New Mexico^{†}	Hughes Stadium; Fort Collins, CO	W 14–9	21,204	
October 29	at Wyoming	War Memorial Stadium; Laramie, WY (rivalry)	L 13–29	25,584	
November 5	at Arizona	Arizona Stadium; Tucson, AZ	W 35–14	41,016	
November 12	at West Texas State*	Kimbrough Memorial Stadium; Canyon, TX	T 21–21	7,200	
November 19	No. 12 Arizona State	Hughes Stadium; Fort Collins, CO	W 25–14	16,706	
November 26	Utah State*	Hughes Stadium; Fort Collins, CO	W 13–10	9,520	
*Non-conference game; ^{†}Homecoming; Rankings from AP Poll released prior to the game

== Roster ==
1977 Colorado State Rams football team roster
Players
Coaches
Offense

Pos.	#	Name	Class
WR	11	Mark Bell	Jr
TE	88	Mark Bell	Jr
TE	83	Rick Dennison	So
QB	7	Dan Graham	Sr
RB	25	Ben Norman	Sr
WR	20	Harry Washington	Sr

Defense

Pos.	#	Name	Class
DE	99	Al Baker	Sr
DE	76	Mike Bell	Jr
LB	90	Mark Nichols	Sr

Special teams

Pos.	#	Name	Class

Head coach

- Sark Arslanian

Coordinators/assistant coaches

Legend

- (C) Team captain
- (S) Suspended
- (I) Ineligible
- Injured
- Redshirt

== Team players in the NFL ==
Player	Position	Round	Pick	NFL club
Al Baker	Defensive End	2	40	Detroit Lions
