= Jack Steptoe =

American football player (born 1956)

No. 87
- Position: Wide receiver

Personal information
- Born: January 21, 1956 (age 70); Greenville, Alabama
- Listed height: 6 ft 1 in (1.85 m)
- Listed weight: 175 lb (79 kg)

Career information
- High school: Alain Leroy Locke
- College: Utah
- NFL draft: 1978: undrafted

Career history
- Chicago Bears (1978)*; San Francisco 49ers (1978)
- * Offseason or practice squad member only

Awards and highlights
- WAC Newcomer of the Year (1976)
- Stats at Pro Football Reference

Jack Eugene Steptoe (born January 21, 1956) is an American former professional football player who was a wide receiver for the San Francisco 49ers of National Football League (NFL). He played college football for the Utah Utes.
