= Nick Eyre =

American football player (1959–2018)

No. 78
- Position: Offensive tackle

Personal information
- Born: June 6, 1959; Las Vegas, Nevada, U.S.
- Died: November 15, 2018 (aged 59); St. George, Utah, U.S.
- Listed height: 6 ft 5 in (1.96 m)
- Listed weight: 276 lb (125 kg)

Career information
- High school: Las Vegas
- College: BYU
- NFL draft: 1981: 4th round, 106th overall pick

Career history
- Houston Oilers (1981); Chicago Blitz (1983)

Awards and highlights
- Consensus All-American (1980); WAC Lineman of the Year (1980)

Career NFL statistics
- Games played: 6
- Stats at Pro Football Reference

Nicholas G. Eyre (June 16, 1959 – November 15, 2018) was an American professional football player who was an offensive tackle in the National Football League (NFL). Eyre played college football for the BYU Cougars, earning consensus All-American honors in 1980. He played for the NFL's Houston Oilers for a single season in 1981.

Eyre was born in Las Vegas and died in St. George, Utah.

Eyre attended Brigham Young University, where he played for the BYU Cougars football team from 1977 to 1980. As a senior in 1980, he was recognized as a consensus first-team All-American.

The Houston Oilers chose Eyre in the fourth round (106th pick overall) of the 1981 NFL draft, and he played for the Oilers in 1981.
