= 1977 Wyoming Cowboys football team =

American college football season

1977 Wyoming Cowboys football
- Conference: Western Athletic Conference
- Record: 4–6–1 (4–3 WAC)
- Head coach: Bill Lewis (1st season)
- Captains: Frank Chesley; Dave Clements; Walter Howard
- Home stadium: War Memorial Stadium

1977 Western Athletic Conference football standings
	Conf.					Overall
Team	W		L		T	W		L		T
No. 20 BYU +	6	–	1	–	0	9	–	2	–	0
No. 18 Arizona State +	6	–	1	–	0	9	–	3	–	0
Colorado State	5	–	2	–	0	9	–	2	–	1
Wyoming	4	–	3	–	0	4	–	6	–	1
Arizona	3	–	4	–	0	5	–	7	–	0
New Mexico	2	–	5	–	0	5	–	7	–	0
Utah	2	–	5	–	0	3	–	8	–	0
UTEP	0	–	7	–	0	1	–	10	–	0
+ – Conference co-champions; Rankings from AP Poll

The 1977 Wyoming Cowboys football team was an American football team that represented the University of Wyoming as a member of the Western Athletic Conference (WAC) during the 1977 NCAA Division I football season. In their first season under head coach Bill Lewis, the Cowboys compiled a 4–6–1 record (4–3 against conference opponents), finished fourth out of eight teams in the WAC, and were outscored by a total of 273 to 166. They played its home games at War Memorial Stadium in Laramie, Wyoming.

== Schedule ==
Date	Opponent	Site	Result	Attendance	Source
September 10	Air Force*	War Memorial Stadium; Laramie, WY	T 0–0	27,107	
September 17	UTEP	War Memorial Stadium; Laramie, WY	W 27–17	20,933	
September 24	at Michigan State*	Spartan Stadium; East Lansing, MI	L 16–34	56,214	
October 1	Arizona	War Memorial Stadium; Laramie, WY	W 13–12	25,133	
October 8	at Utah	Robert Rice Stadium; Salt Lake City, UT	L 13–23	26,428	
October 22	No. 17 BYU	War Memorial Stadium; Laramie, WY	L 7–10	25,398	
October 29	Colorado State	War Memorial Stadium; Laramie, WY (rivalry)	W 29–13	25,584	
November 5	at No. 19 Arizona State	Sun Devil Stadium; Tempe, AZ	L 0–45	55,232	
November 12	at Utah State*	Maverik Stadium; Logan, UT (rivalry)	L 31–32	13,280	
November 19	at New Mexico	University Stadium; Albuquerque, NM	W 23–21	9,550	
November 26	at LSU*	Tiger Stadium; Baton Rouge, LA	L 7–66	52,338	
*Non-conference game; Rankings from AP Poll released prior to the game
