= 1977 Arizona State Sun Devils football team =

American college football season

1977 Arizona State Sun Devils football

WAC co-champion

Fiesta Bowl, L 30–42 vs. Penn State
- Conference: Western Athletic Conference

Ranking
- Coaches: No. 18
- AP: No. 18
- Record: 9–3 (6–1 WAC)
- Head coach: Frank Kush (20th season)
- Defensive coordinator: Larry Kentera (7th season)
- Home stadium: Sun Devil Stadium

1977 Western Athletic Conference football standings
	Conf.					Overall
Team	W		L		T	W		L		T
No. 20 BYU +	6	–	1	–	0	9	–	2	–	0
No. 18 Arizona State +	6	–	1	–	0	9	–	3	–	0
Colorado State	5	–	2	–	0	9	–	2	–	1
Wyoming	4	–	3	–	0	4	–	6	–	1
Arizona	3	–	4	–	0	5	–	7	–	0
New Mexico	2	–	5	–	0	5	–	7	–	0
Utah	2	–	5	–	0	3	–	8	–	0
UTEP	0	–	7	–	0	1	–	10	–	0
+ – Conference co-champions; Rankings from AP Poll

The 1977 Arizona State Sun Devils football team represented Arizona State University during the 1977 NCAA Division I football season. This was Arizona State's final season as a member of the Western Athletic Conference (WAC).

== Schedule ==
Date	Opponent	Rank	Site	TV	Result	Attendance	Source
September 17	Northwestern*		Sun Devil Stadium; Tempe, AZ		W 35–3	57,149	
September 24	Oregon State*		Sun Devil Stadium; Tempe, AZ		W 33–31	57,535	
October 1	Missouri*	No. 20	Sun Devil Stadium; Tempe, AZ		L 0–15	57,874	
October 8	at New Mexico		University Stadium; Albuquerque, NM		W 45–24	22,310	
October 15	at Air Force*		Falcon Stadium; Colorado Springs, CO		W 37–14	25,477	
October 22	UTEP		Sun Devil Stadium; Tempe, AZ		W 66–3	55,446	
October 29	at Utah		Robert Rice Stadium; Salt Lake City, UT		W 47–19	16,528	
November 5	Wyoming	No. 19	Sun Devil Stadium; Tempe, AZ		W 45–0	55,232	
November 12	No. 13 BYU	No. 17	Sun Devil Stadium; Tempe, AZ		W 24–13	58,295	
November 19	at Colorado State	No. 12	Hughes Stadium; Fort Collins, CO		L 14–25	16,706	
November 25	Arizona	No. 19	Sun Devil Stadium; Tempe, AZ	ABC	W 23–7	56,326	
December 25	vs. No. 8 Penn State*	No. 15	Sun Devil Stadium; Tempe, AZ (Fiesta Bowl)	CBS	L 30–42	57,727	
*Non-conference game; Rankings from AP Poll released prior to the game

== Personnel ==
1977 Arizona State Sun Devils football team roster
Players
Coaches
Offense

Pos.	#	Name	Class
WR	84	John Jefferson	Sr
QB		Mark Malone	So
RB		Jeff McIntyre	Jr
QB	10	Dennis Sproul	Sr

Defense

Pos.	#	Name	Class
DE	82	Al Harris	Jr
DE	95	Bob Kohrs	So

Special teams

Pos.	#	Name	Class

Head coach

- Frank Kush

Coordinators/assistant coaches

Legend

- (C) Team captain
- (S) Suspended
- (I) Ineligible
- Injured
- Redshirt
