= LaVell Edwards =

American football player and coach (1930–2016)

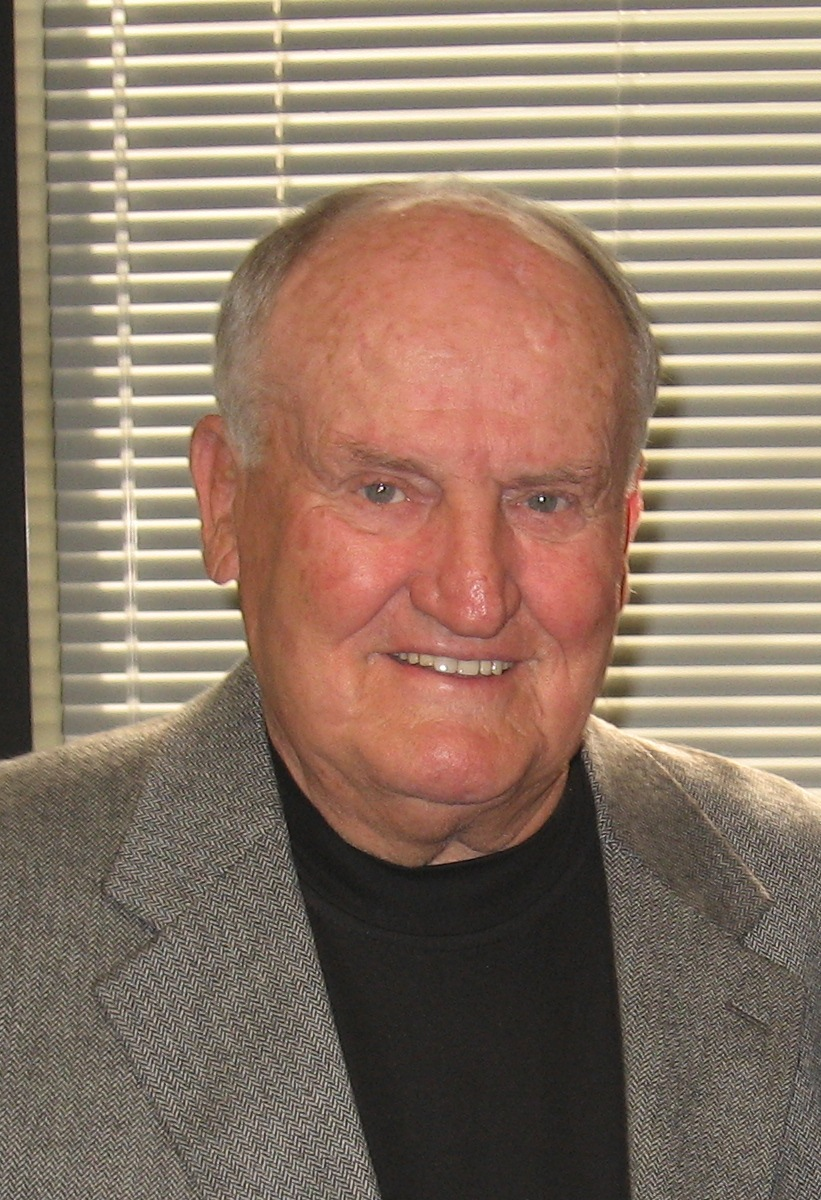
- Edwards in 2010

Biographical details
- Born: October 11, 1930; Orem, Utah, U.S.
- Died: December 29, 2016 (aged 86); Provo, Utah, U.S.
- Education: Utah State University (B.A.); University of Utah (M.Ed.); Brigham Young University (Ed.D.)

Playing career
- 1949–1951: Utah State
- Position: Offensive lineman

Coaching career (HC unless noted)
- 1954–1961: Granite HS (UT)
- 1962–1971: BYU (assistant)
- 1972–2000: BYU

Head coaching record
- Overall: 257–101–3 (college)
- Bowls: 7–14–1

Accomplishments and honors

Championships
- 1 National (1984); 18 WAC (1974, 1976–1985, 1989–1993, 1995–1996); 1 MWC (1999) 1 WAC Mountain Division (1996) 1 WAC Pacific Division (1998)

Awards
- Bobby Dodd Coach of the Year Award (1979); AFCA Coach of the Year (1984); Eddie Robinson Coach of the Year (1984); 7× WAC Coach of the Year (1972, 1979, 1980, 1983, 1984, 1990, 1996); Amos Alonzo Stagg Award (2003)
- College Football Hall of Fame; Inducted in 2004 (profile)

Reuben LaVell Edwards (October 11, 1930 – December 29, 2016) was an American college football head coach for Brigham Young University (BYU). With 257 career victories, he ranks as one of the most successful college football coaches of all time. Among his notable accomplishments, Edwards guided BYU to a national championship in 1984 and coached Heisman Trophy winner Ty Detmer in 1990. Edwards was inducted into the College Football Hall of Fame in 2004.

Edwards played football for Utah State University and earned a master's degree at the University of Utah prior to coaching at BYU, where he also earned his doctorate.

== Coaching career ==
Edwards was BYU's head football coach from 1972 to 2000. He had previously served as an assistant coach from 1962 to 1971. His offensive scheme was passing-dominated. He started coaching in an era when college football offenses were dominated by strong running attacks. His quarterbacks threw over 11,000 passes for more than 100,000 yards and 635 touchdowns. He got the idea to switch to a pass oriented team by looking at BYU's history. The BYU football program had struggled before Edwards with the notable exception of one conference championship that resulted from the aerial attack of Virgil Carter. This past success encouraged Edwards to open up the BYU offense.

Edwards coached prominent quarterbacks such as Steve Young, Jim McMahon, Ty Detmer, Marc Wilson, Robbie Bosco, Gary Scheide, Gifford Nielsen and Steve Sarkisian.

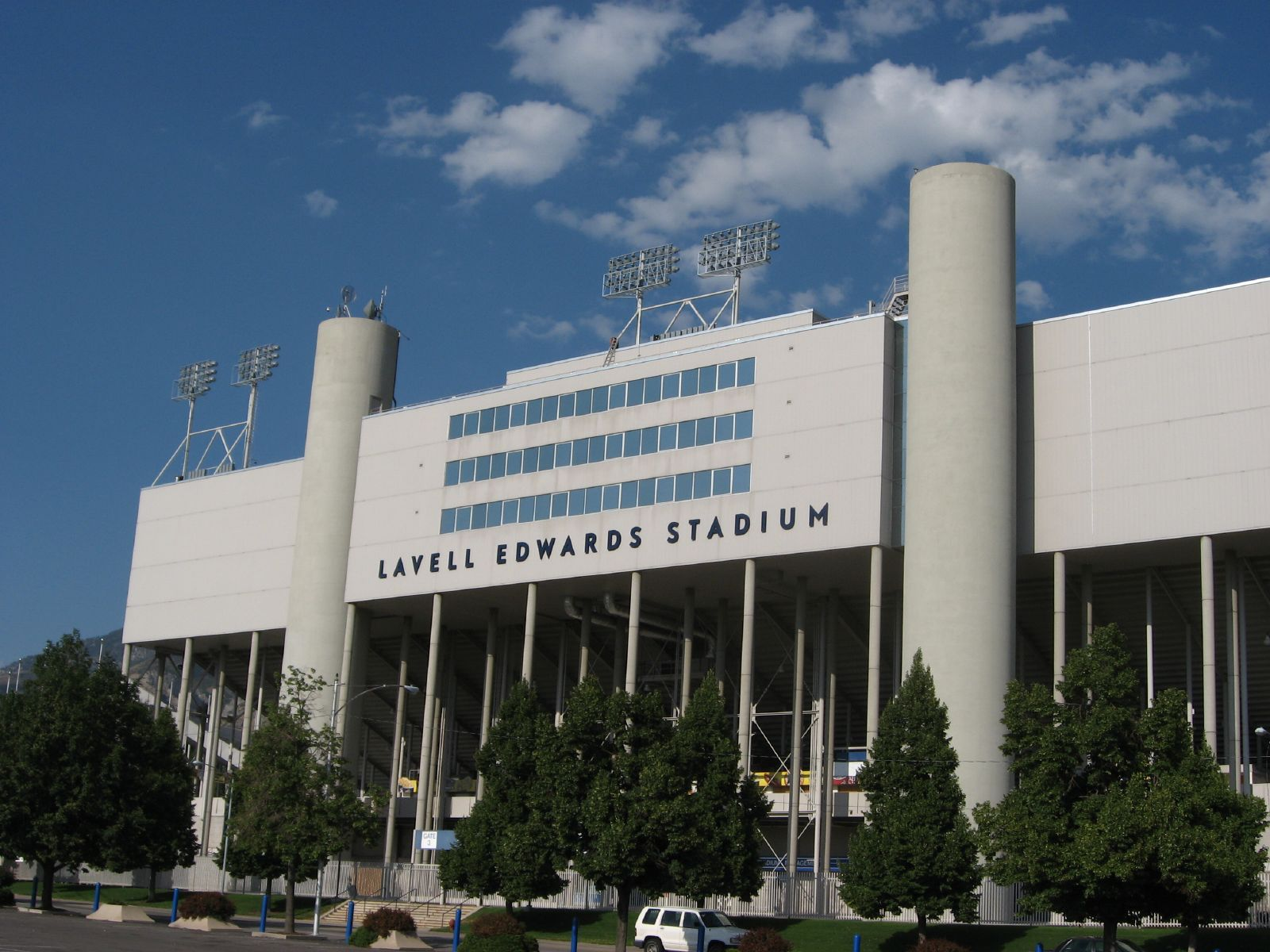
LaVell Edwards Stadium at Brigham Young University

Awards won by his players include a Heisman Trophy, a Doak Walker Award, a Maxwell Award, two Outland Trophies, four Davey O'Brien Awards, seven Sammy Baugh Awards, 34 All-America citations (including 10 consensus All-Americans), 11 conference player of the year and 24 Academic All-America player citations.

In 1984, he was named National Coach of the Year after BYU finished the season 13–0 and won the National Championship. Edwards retired after the 2000 season with a 257–101–3 record.

Prior to Edwards' final game, BYU renamed its home field, Cougar Stadium, as LaVell Edwards Stadium in his honor. The stadium had almost doubled in his capacity during his tenure, from 35,000 people when he took over the program to over 65,000 people upon his retirement.

At the time of his retirement, he ranked sixth all-time in victories, and second all-time in victories with a single program (behind only Joe Paterno at Penn State). Edwards received the Amos Alonzo Stagg Award, presented by the American Football Coaches Association, in 2003.

In the 1980 Holiday Bowl, BYU rallied from a 45–25 deficit with only 4 minutes to play to defeat Southern Methodist University (SMU).

Following the 1984 national championship, Edwards was offered head coaching positions with the Detroit Lions and the University of Texas at Austin, but he turned down both offers.

=== Accomplishments ===
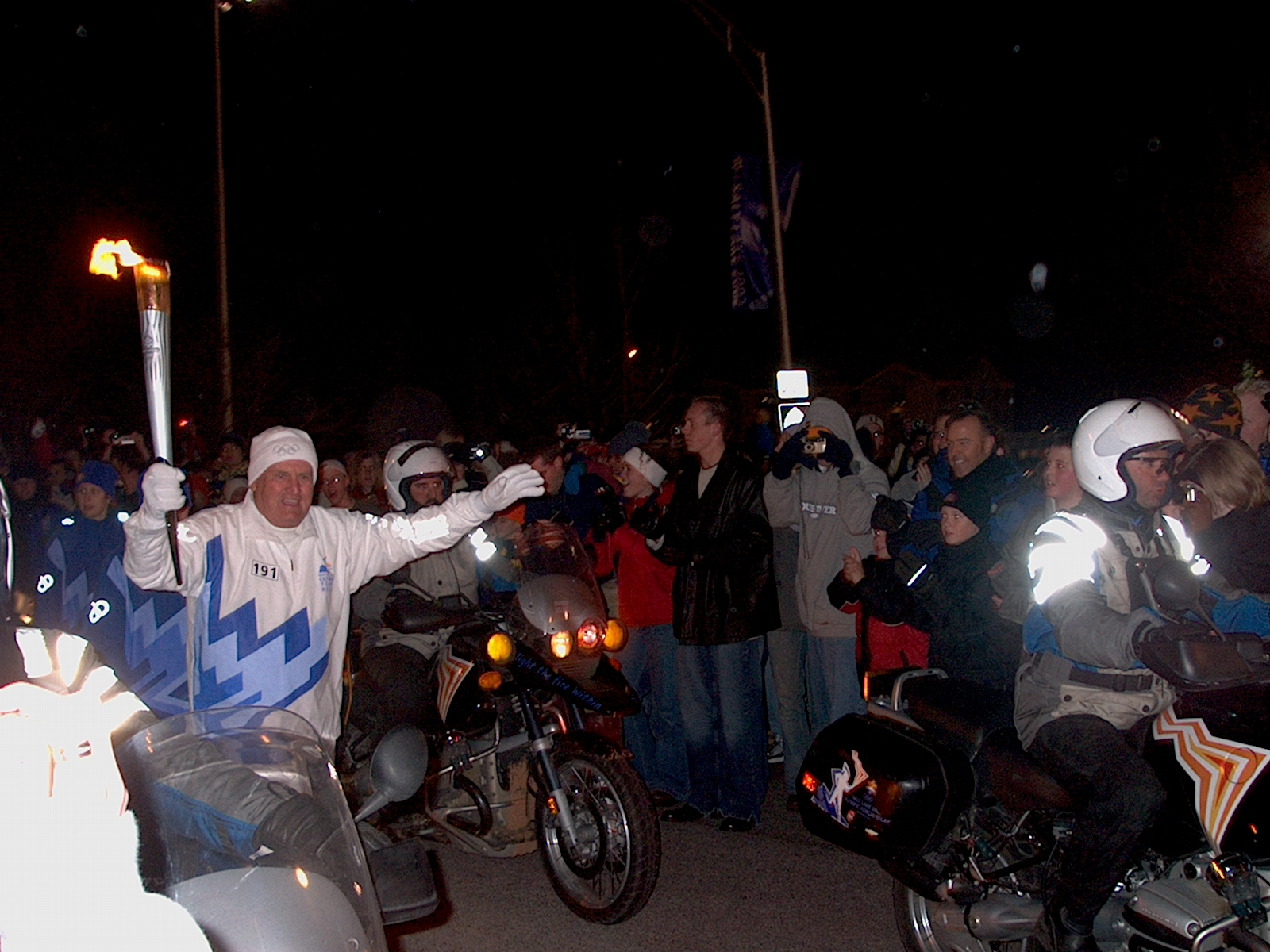
Edwards carrying the Olympic Torch in 2002

- 22nd on NCAA all-time list for coaching victories (257)
- Member of the College Football Hall of Fame
- Coached six all-American quarterbacks
- His teams led the nation in passing offense eight times
- His teams led the nation in total offense five times
- His teams led the nation in scoring offense three times

== Coaching tree ==
Eight of Edwards's assistants later became head coaches in the NCAA or NFL:

- Dave Kragthorpe, Idaho State (1980–1982), Oregon State (1985–1990)
- Doug Scovil, San Diego State (1981–1985)
- Ted Tollner, USC (1983–1986), San Diego State (1994–2001)
- Mike Holmgren, Green Bay Packers (1992–1998), Seattle Seahawks (1999–2008)
- Gary Crowton, Louisiana Tech (1996–1998), BYU (2001–2004)
- Tom Holmoe, California (1997–2001)
- Charlie Stubbs, Nicholls State (2010–2014)
- Norm Chow, Hawaii (2012–2015)

Five of Edwards's former players later became head coaches in the NCAA or NFL:

- Brian Billick, Baltimore Ravens (1999–2007) (graduate assistant - 1978)
- Andy Reid, Philadelphia Eagles (1999–2012), Kansas City Chiefs (2013–present) (graduate assistant - 1982)
- Kyle Whittingham, Utah (2005–2025), Michigan (2026–present) (graduate assistant - 1985–1986)
- Steve Sarkisian, Washington (2009–2013), USC (2014–2015), Texas (2021–present)
- Kalani Sitake, BYU (2016–present)

Although not officially a part of the coaching tree, Mike Leach, former head coach Texas Tech, Washington State, and Mississippi State, learned from Edwards as well, as Leach sat in on game film sessions with the BYU coaches while attending BYU.

Numerous other prominent coaches appear as offshoots on the Edwards tree. Holmgren's coaching tree includes Jon Gruden, Steve Mariucci, Jim Mora, Todd Bowles, and Mike Sherman. Reid's tree includes John Harbaugh, Brad Childress, Doug Pederson, Sean McDermott, and Ron Rivera. Billick's tree includes Rex Ryan, Marvin Lewis, and Jack Del Rio.

== Head coaching record ==
Year	Team	Overall	Conference	Standing	Bowl/playoffs	Coaches^{#}	AP^{°}
BYU Cougars (Western Athletic Conference) (1972–1998)
1972	BYU	7–4	5–2	T–2nd			
1973	BYU	5–6	3–4	T–4th			
1974	BYU	7–4–1	6–0–1	1st	L Fiesta		
1975	BYU	6–5	4–3	T–4th			
1976	BYU	9–3	6–1	T–1st	L Tangerine		
1977	BYU	9–2	6–1	T–1st		16	20
1978	BYU	9–4	5–1	1st	L Holiday		
1979	BYU	11–1	7–0	1st	L Holiday	12	13
1980	BYU	12–1	6–1	1st	W Holiday	11	12
1981	BYU	11–2	7–1	1st	W Holiday	11	13
1982	BYU	8–4	7–1	1st	L Holiday		
1983	BYU	11–1	7–0	1st	W Holiday	7	7
1984	BYU	13–0	8–0	1st	W Holiday	1	1
1985	BYU	11–3	7–1	1st	L Florida Citrus	17	16
1986	BYU	8–5	6–2	2nd	L Freedom		
1987	BYU	9–4	7–1	2nd	L All-American		
1988	BYU	9–4	5–3	T–3rd	W Freedom		
1989	BYU	10–3	7–1	1st	L Holiday	18	22
1990	BYU	10–3	7–1	1st	L Holiday	T–17	22
1991	BYU	8–3–2	7–0–1	1st	T Holiday	23	23
1992	BYU	8–5	6–2	T–1st	L Aloha		
1993	BYU	6–6	6–2	T–1st	L Holiday		
1994	BYU	10–3	6–2	T–2nd	W Copper	10	18
1995	BYU	7–4	6–2	T–1st			
1996	BYU	14–1	8–0	1st (Mountain)	W Cotton	5	5
1997	BYU	6–5	4–4	5th (Mountain)			
1998	BYU	9–5	7–1	T–1st (Pacific)	L Liberty		
BYU Cougars (Mountain West Conference) (1999–2000)
1999	BYU	8–4	5–2	T–1st	L Motor City		
2000	BYU	6–6	4–3	T–3rd			
BYU:		257–101–3	175–42–2				
Total:		257–101–3					
National championship Conference title Conference division title or championship game berth
^{#}Rankings from final Coaches Poll.; ^{°}Rankings from final AP Poll.

== Personal life ==
While head football coach at BYU, Edwards also earned a doctorate.

Following his retirement from coaching, Edwards remained a prominent leader and speaker in the Church of Jesus Christ of Latter-day Saints (LDS Church), which owns and operates BYU. He and his wife served an eighteen-month mission for the LDS Church in New York City during 2002 and 2003. He lived in Provo, Utah until his death.

== Death ==
Edwards suffered a broken hip on December 24, 2016, and died five days later at his home in Provo on December 29, at the age of 86. A public memorial service was held at the Utah Valley Convention Center in Provo on January 6, 2017. A private funeral service for family and friends was then held the next day, on January 7.

== See also ==
- Legends Poll
- List of college football career coaching wins leaders
- List of presidents of the American Football Coaches Association
