= Marc Wilson (American football) =

American football player (born 1957)

No. 6, 15
- Position: Quarterback

Personal information
- Born: February 15, 1957 (age 69); Bremerton, Washington, U.S.
- Listed height: 6 ft 6 in (1.98 m)
- Listed weight: 205 lb (93 kg)

Career information
- High school: Shorecrest (Shoreline, Washington)
- College: BYU (1976–1979)
- NFL draft: 1980: 1st round, 15th overall pick

Career history
- Oakland / Los Angeles Raiders (1980–1987); Green Bay Packers (1988)*; New England Patriots (1989–1990)
- * Offseason or practice squad member only

Awards and highlights
- 2× Super Bowl champion (XV, XVIII); Unanimous All-American (1979); NCAA passing yards leader (1979); 2× WAC Offensive Player of the Year (1977, 1979); First-team All-WAC (1979); Sammy Baugh Trophy (1979); BYU Cougars No. 6 retired

Career NFL statistics
- Passing attempts: 2,081
- Passing completions: 1,085
- Completion percentage: 52.1%
- TD–INT: 86–102
- Passing yards: 14,391
- Passer rating: 67.7
- Rushing yards: 611
- Rushing touchdowns: 5
- Stats at Pro Football Reference
- College Football Hall of Fame

Marc Douglas Wilson (born February 15, 1957) is an American former professional football player who was a quarterback for 10 seasons in the National Football League (NFL), primarily with the Oakland / Los Angeles Raiders. He played college football for the BYU Cougars, winning the Sammy Baugh Trophy in 1979. Selected by the Raiders in the first round of the 1980 NFL draft, Wilson spent seven seasons with the team. In his final two seasons, he was a member of the New England Patriots. Wilson was inducted to College Football Hall of Fame in 1996.

== Early life ==
Wilson was born in Bremerton, Washington. Raised in the greater Seattle area, he attended Shorecrest High School in Shoreline, Washington.

== College career ==
Wilson attended Brigham Young University, where he played for the BYU Cougars football team from 1976 to 1979 and was one of the first in BYU's celebrated line of quarterbacks. Cougars coach LaVell Edwards operated a passing-oriented offense that allowed his quarterbacks to throw the ball almost every single down. Thus, Wilson was able to pile up huge passing numbers in an era when most teams mainly focused on running the ball. Wilson received a bachelor's degree in economics from Brigham Young University in 1980. In 1996, he received an executive MBA from the University of Washington.

He first got a chance to start in the fifth game of the 1977 season, replacing All-American Gifford Nielsen, who had gone down after four contests with an injury. During that 1977 season, his sophomore year, he threw for seven touchdown passes in one game against Colorado State University, his first start. After that, he started most of BYU's games over the next two-and-a-half seasons, racking up a 22–4 record, though he did yield a few starts to budding star Jim McMahon. In 1979, he threw 250 completions for 3,720 yards and 29 touchdown passes, becoming the school's first consensus All-American. Highlights of his 1979 season included leading the team to an undefeated regular season and a berth in the Holiday Bowl, where he shared the MVP trophy with Indiana University cornerback Tim Wilbur in BYU's 38–37 loss. He finished fourth in the nation in passing efficiency, third in the Heisman voting, and was named the Senior Bowl MVP. Wilson's success paved the way for McMahon, Steve Young, Robbie Bosco, Ty Detmer, and other BYU quarterbacks, all of whom had similar performances in Edwards' system.

== Professional career ==
Wilson was selected 15th overall in the first round of the 1980 NFL draft by the Oakland Raiders. As a rookie, he was a backup alongside Jim Plunkett on the Raiders to Dan Pastorini. A fractured leg injury for Pastorini opened the door for Plunkett because of his experience over the rookie, which resulted in a trip to Super Bowl XV and a victory over the Philadelphia Eagles. The following year, Wilson would start nine games for the Raiders following a season ending injury to Plunkett. He won five of those games while throwing for 2,311 yards on 14 touchdowns to 19 interceptions. In 1982, he was the backup to Plunkett during a strike shortened NFL season consisting of only nine games. In 1983, he became the starting quarterback for the Raiders in the middle of the season after Plunkett was benched for ineffectiveness, but it lasted just three games before a broken shoulder against the Kansas City Chiefs knocked him out for the entire season. The Raiders, led by Plunkett, would go on to a Super Bowl XVIII victory against the Washington Redskins.

In 1984, he was the starter for ten games and won six of them while throwing for 2,151 yards with fifteen touchdowns to seventeen interceptions. He finished the regular season with a broken thumb suffered during a matchup against the Chicago Bears, but was benched in favor of Plunkett for the playoffs, where the Raiders lost in the wild card round. Following another injury to Plunkett in Week 3 of the 1985 season, Wilson had his first (and as it turned out only) chance to play as the regular starter. He started thirteen games and led the Raiders to eleven wins and an AFC West title while throwing for a career high 2,608 yards with 16 touchdowns to 21 interceptions. He made the start in the AFC Divisional game against the New England Patriots. He threw 11-of-27 for 135 yards with a touchdown and three interceptions.

In 1986, he started eight games and threw 1,721 yards with 12 touchdowns to 15 interceptions with the Raiders rotating Plunkett and Wilson as the starting quarterback. He closed out his Raiders career in 1987 as the starter for seven games (two wins) while throwing for 2,070 yards with 12 touchdowns to eight interceptions. He moved on to the Patriots (after being cut by the Green Bay Packers in training camp) in 1989 and started 10 games in two seasons combined. He retired at the age of 33 in 1990.

== Career statistics ==
=== NFL ===
Legend
	Won the Super Bowl
	Led the league
**Bold**	Career high

Year	Team	Games			Passing									Rushing					Sacks	
Year	Team	GP	GS	Record	Cmp	Att	Pct	Yds	Y/A	Lng	TD	Int	Rtg	Att	Yds	Avg	Lng	TD	Sck	Yds
1980	OAK	2	0	0−0	3	5	**60.0**	31	6.2	12	0	0	77.9	1	3	3.0	3	0	0	0
1981	OAK	13	9	5−4	173	366	47.3	2,311	6.3	66	14	19	58.9	**30**	**147**	4.9	18	**2**	30	**241**
1982	RAI	8	0	0−0	1	2	50.0	4	2.0	4	0	0	56.2	0	0	0.0	0	0	0	0
1983	RAI	10	3	2−1	67	117	57.3	864	7.4	50	8	6	82.0	13	122	**9.4**	**23**	0	0	0
1984	RAI	16	10	6−4	153	282	54.3	2,151	7.6	**92**	15	17	71.7	**30**	56	1.9	14	1	**37**	228
1985	RAI	16	13	**11−2**	**193**	**388**	49.7	**2,608**	6.7	59	**16**	**21**	62.7	24	98	4.1	17	**2**	27	202
1986	RAI	16	8	5−3	129	240	53.8	1,721	7.2	57	12	15	67.4	14	45	3.2	13	0	34	227
1987	RAI	15	7	2−5	152	266	57.1	2,070	**7.8**	47	12	8	**84.6**	17	91	5.4	16	0	33	238
1989	NWE	14	4	1−3	75	150	50.0	1,006	6.7	65	3	5	64.5	7	42	6.0	11	0	10	71
1990	NWE	16	6	0−6	139	265	52.5	1,625	6.1	36	6	11	61.6	5	7	1.4	6	0	29	228
Career		126	60	32−28	1,085	2,081	52.1	14,391	6.9	92	86	102	67.7	141	611	4.3	23	5	210	1,510

=== College ===
Legend
	Led the WAC
	WAC record
	Led the NCAA
	NCAA record
**Bold**	Career high

College passing & rushing statistics*
Season	School	Games	Cmp	Att	Yds	Pct	TD	INT	QBR	Car	Yds	Avg	TD
Team		Passing								Rushing			
1977	BYU	11	164	277	2,418	**59.2%**	24	18	**148.1**	81	20	0.2	2
1978	BYU	12	121	233	1,499	51.9%	8	**13**	106.1	**104**	**85**	**0.8**	2
1979	BYU	11	**250**	**427**	**3,720**	58.5%	**29**	15	147.1	61	−140	−2.3	**4**
Career	BYU	34	535	937	7,637	57.1%	61	46	137.2	246	-35	-0.1	8

* Includes bowl games.

== See also ==
- List of NCAA major college football yearly passing leaders
- List of NCAA major college football yearly total offense leaders
