= 1977 All-Pacific-8 Conference football team =

1977 Pacific-8 Conference football standings
	Conf.					Overall
Team	W		L		T	W		L		T
No. 10 Washington $	6	–	1	–	0	8	–	4	–	0
No. 15 Stanford	5	–	2	–	0	9	–	3	–	0
No. 13 USC	5	–	2	–	0	8	–	4	–	0
California	3	–	4	–	0	7	–	4	–	0
Washington State	3	–	4	–	0	6	–	5	–	0
Oregon	1	–	6	–	0	2	–	9	–	0
Oregon State	0	–	7	–	0	2	–	9	–	0
UCLA †	0	–	2	–	0	0	–	4	–	0
$ – Conference champion; † – UCLA forfeited 7 wins (5 conference wins) due to ineligible players.; Rankings from AP Poll

The 1977 All-Pacific-8 Conference football team consists of American football players chosen by various organizations for All-Pacific-8 Conference teams for the 1977 NCAA Division I football season.

== Offensive selections ==
=== Quarterbacks ===
- Guy Benjamin, Stanford (Coaches-1; UPI-1)
- Jack Thompson, Washington State (Coaches-2; UPI-2)

=== Running backs ===
- Charles White, USC (Coaches-1; UPI-1)
- Darrin Nelson, Stanford (Coaches-1; UPI-1)
- David Turner, San Diego State (UPI-1)
- Joe Steele, Washington (Coaches-2; UPI-2)
- Paul Jones, California (Coaches-2; UPI-2)
- Bruce Gibson, Pacific (UPI-2)

=== Wide receivers ===
- James Lofton, Stanford (Coaches-1; UPI-1)
- Mike Levenseller, Washington State (Coaches-1; UPI-2)
- Jesse Thompson, California (Coaches-2)
- Randy Simmrin, USC (Coaches-2)

=== Tight ends ===
- George Freitas, California (Coaches-1; UPI-1)
- William Gay, USC (Coaches-2; UPI-2)

=== Tackles ===
- Gordon King, Stanford (Coaches-1; UPI-1)
- Gus Coppens, UCLA (Coaches-1; UPI-1)
- Anthony Muñoz, USC (Coaches-2; UPI-2)
- John Schuhmacher, USC (Coaches-2; UPI-2)

=== Guards ===
- Pat Howell, USC (Coaches-1; UPI-1)
- Jeff Toews, Washington (Coaches-1; UPI-2)
- Brad Budde, USC (Coaches-1; UPI-2)
- Chuck Shrn, Fresno State (UPI-1)
- Duke Leffler, California (Coaches-2)
- Mark Hill, Stanford (Coaches-2)

=== Centers ===
- Blair Bush, Washington (Coaches-1; UPI-1)
- Jim Walker, Oregon State (Coaches-2; UPI-2)

== Defensive selections ==
=== Linemen ===
- Ralph DeLoach, California (Coaches-1; UPI-1)
- Manu Tuiasosopo, UCLA (Coaches-1; UPI-1)
- Walt Underwood, USC (Coaches-1; UPI-1)
- Dave Browning, Washington (Coaches-2; UPI-1)
- George Yarno, Washington State (UPI-1)
- Greg Marshall, Oregon State (Coaches-2; UPI-2)
- Doug Martin, Washington (Coaches-2; UPI-2)
- Mel Cook, Oregon (UPI-2)
- Simon Peterson, Fresno State (UPI-2)

=== Linebackers ===
- Gordy Ceresino, Stanford (Coaches-1; UPI-1)
- Jerry Robinson, UCLA (Coaches-1; UPI-1)
- Michael Jackson, Washington (Coaches-1; UPI-2)
- Clay Matthews Jr., USC (Coaches-1; UPI-2)
- Dan Bunz, Long Beach State (UPI-1)
- Frank Stephens, UCLA (Coaches-2)
- Don Hover, Washington State (Coaches-2)
- Burl Toler, California (Coaches-2)
- Ed Gutierrez, USC (Coaches-2)
- Frank Manumaleuga, San Jose State (UPI-2)

=== Defensive backs ===
- Dennis Thurman, USC (Coaches-1; UPI-1)
- Levi Armstrong, UCLA (Coaches-1; UPI-1)
- Ken Easley, UCLA (Coaches-1; UPI-2)
- Nesby Glasgow, Washington (Coaches-1; UPI-2)
- Ricky Odom, USC (Coaches-1)
- Gerald Smil, San Jose State (UPI-1)
- Kyle Heinrich, Washington (Coaches-2; UPI-2)
- Anthony Green, California (Coaches-2)
- Ken Greene, Washington State (Coaches-2)
- Lenny Holmes, Oregon State (Coaches-2)
- Ken McAllister, California (Coaches-2)

== Special teams ==
=== Placekickers ===
- Jim Breech, California (Coaches-1; UPI-1)
- Frank Corral, UCLA (Coaches-2)
- Vince Petrucci, Fresno State (UPI-2)

=== Punters ===
- Gavin Hedrick, Washington State (Coaches-1)
- Dan Melville, California (Coaches-2)

== Key ==
Coaches = Pacific-8 football coaches

UPI = United Press International, selected by UPI from all teams on the Pacific Coast, not limited to the Pac-8 Conference

== See also ==
- 1977 College Football All-America Team
