= 1977–78 NCAA football bowl games =

Series of post-season NCAA football games

- Season: 1977
- Number of bowls: 13
- Bowl games: December 17, 1977 – January 2, 1978
- National Championship: 1978 Cotton Bowl Classic
- Location of Championship: Cotton Bowl, Dallas, Texas
- Champions: Notre Dame
Bowl record by conference
Conference	Bowls	Record	Final AP poll

The 1977–78 NCAA football bowl games were a series of post-season games played in December 1977 and January 1978 to end the 1977 NCAA Division I football season. A total of 13 team-competitive games were played. The post-season began with the Independence Bowl on December 17, 1977, and concluded on January 2, 1978, with the Orange Bowl.

== Schedule ==
Date	Game	Site	TV	Teams	Results
Dec. 17	Independence Bowl	State Fair Stadium; Shreveport, Louisiana	WTCG-TV	Louisiana Tech (8–1–2); Louisville (7–3–1)	Louisiana Tech 24; Louisville 14
Dec. 19	Liberty Bowl	Liberty Bowl Memorial Stadium; Memphis, Tennessee	ABC	No. 12 Nebraska (8–3); No. 14 North Carolina (8–2–1)	Nebraska 21; North Carolina 17
Dec. 22	Hall of Fame Classic	Legion Field; Birmingham, Alabama	Mizlou	Maryland (7–4); Minnesota (6–5)	Maryland 17; Minnesota 7
Dec. 23	Tangerine Bowl	Orlando Stadium; Orlando, Florida	Mizlou	No. 19 Florida State (9–2); Texas Tech (7–4)	Florida State 40; Texas Tech 17
Dec. 25	Fiesta Bowl	Sun Devil Stadium; Tempe, Arizona	CBS	No. 8 Penn State (10–1); No. 15 Arizona State (9–2)	Penn State 42; Arizona State 30
Dec. 30	Gator Bowl	Gator Bowl Stadium; Jacksonville, Florida	ABC	No. 10 Pittsburgh (8–2–1); No. 11 Clemson (8–2–1)	Pittsburgh 34; Clemson 3
Dec. 31	Peach Bowl	Fulton County Stadium; Atlanta, Georgia	Mizlou	NC State (7–4); Iowa State (8–3)	NC State 24; Iowa State 14
Dec. 31	Sun Bowl	Sun Bowl; El Paso, Texas	CBS	Stanford (8–3); LSU (8–3)	Stanford 24; LSU 14
Dec. 31	Astro-Bluebonnet Bowl	Astrodome; Houston, Texas	Mizlou	No. 20 USC (7–4); No. 18 Texas A&M (8–3)	USC 47; Texas A&M 28
Jan. 2	Cotton Bowl Classic	Cotton Bowl; Dallas, Texas	CBS	No. 5 Notre Dame (10–1); No. 1 Texas (11–0)	Notre Dame 38; Texas 10
Jan. 2	Sugar Bowl	Louisiana Superdome; New Orleans, Louisiana	ABC	No. 3 Alabama (10–1); No. 9 Ohio State (9–2)	Alabama 35; Ohio State 6
Jan. 2	Rose Bowl	Rose Bowl; Pasadena, California	NBC	No. 13 Washington (7–4); No. 4 Michigan (10–1)	Washington 27; Michigan 20
Jan. 2	Orange Bowl	Miami Orange Bowl; Miami, Florida	NBC	No. 6 Arkansas (10–1); No. 2 Oklahoma (10–1)	Arkansas 31; Oklahoma 6

Rankings from AP Poll
