= 1977 USC Trojans football team =

American college football season

1977 USC Trojans football

Astro-Bluebonnet Bowl, W 47–28 vs. Texas A&M
- Conference: Pacific-8 Conference

Ranking
- Coaches: No. 12
- AP: No. 13
- Record: 8–4 (5–2 Pac-8)
- Head coach: John Robinson (2nd season)
- Captains: Rob Hertel; Clay Matthews Jr.
- Home stadium: Los Angeles Memorial Coliseum

1977 Pacific-8 Conference football standings
	Conf.					Overall
Team	W		L		T	W		L		T
No. 10 Washington $	6	–	1	–	0	8	–	4	–	0
No. 15 Stanford	5	–	2	–	0	9	–	3	–	0
No. 13 USC	5	–	2	–	0	8	–	4	–	0
California	3	–	4	–	0	7	–	4	–	0
Washington State	3	–	4	–	0	6	–	5	–	0
Oregon	1	–	6	–	0	2	–	9	–	0
Oregon State	0	–	7	–	0	2	–	9	–	0
UCLA †	0	–	2	–	0	0	–	4	–	0
$ – Conference champion; † – UCLA forfeited 7 wins (5 conference wins) due to ineligible players.; Rankings from AP Poll

The 1977 USC Trojans football team represented the University of Southern California (USC) in the 1977 NCAA Division I football season. In their second year under head coach John Robinson, the Trojans compiled a 8–4 record (5–2 against conference opponents), finished in a tie for second place in the Pacific-8 Conference (Pac-8), and outscored their opponents by a combined total of 357 to 212. The team was ranked #12 in the final UPI Coaches Poll and #13 in the final AP Poll.

Quarterback Rob Hertel led the team in passing, completing 132 of 245 passes for 2,145 yards with 19 touchdowns and 18 interceptions. Charles White led the team in rushing with 285 carries for 1,478 yards and seven touchdowns. Randy Simmrin led the team in receiving with 41 catches for 840 yards and five touchdowns.

== Schedule ==
Date	Opponent	Rank	Site	TV	Result	Attendance	Source
September 10	at Missouri*	No. 4	Faurot Field; Columbia, MO		W 27–10	65,298	
September 17	at Oregon State	No. 2	Parker Stadium; Corvallis, OR		W 17–10	31,143	
September 24	TCU*	No. 2	Los Angeles Memorial Coliseum; Los Angeles, CA		W 51–0	54,620	
September 30	Washington State	No. 2	Los Angeles Memorial Coliseum; Los Angeles, CA		W 41–7	61,809	
October 8	No. 7 Alabama*	No. 1	Los Angeles Memorial Coliseum; Los Angeles, CA	ABC	L 20–21	63,140	
October 15	Oregon^{†}	No. 6	Los Angeles Memorial Coliseum; Los Angeles, CA		W 33–15	51,120	
October 22	at No. 11 Notre Dame*	No. 5	Notre Dame Stadium; Notre Dame, IN (rivalry)	ABC	L 19–49	59,075	
October 29	at California	No. 10	California Memorial Stadium; Berkeley, CA		L 14–17	76,780	
November 5	Stanford	No. 16	Los Angeles Memorial Coliseum; Los Angeles, CA (rivalry)		W 49–0	65,101	
November 12	at Washington	No. 14	Husky Stadium; Seattle, WA		L 10–28	59,501	
November 25	No. 17 UCLA		Los Angeles Memorial Coliseum; Los Angeles, CA (Victory Bell)	ABC	W 29–27	86,168	
December 31	vs. No. 17 Texas A&M*	No. 20	Houston Astrodome; Houston, TX (Astro-Bluebonnet Bowl)	Mizlou	W 47–28	52,842	
*Non-conference game; ^{†}Homecoming; Rankings from AP Poll released prior to the game

== Game summaries ==
=== UCLA ===
Team	1	2	3	4	Total
• USC	0	17	9	3	29
UCLA	10	0	7	10	27

- Date: November 25
- Location: Los Angeles Memorial Coliseum, Los Angeles
- Game attendance: 86,168

Scoring summary
1		UCLA	Carrol 52-yard field goal	UCLA 3–0
1		UCLA	Brown 1-yard run (Carrol kick)	UCLA 10–0
2		USC	Jordan 25-yard field goal	UCLA 10–3
2		USC	Gay 20-yard pass from Hertel (kick failed)	UCLA 10–9
2		USC	Williams 40-yard pass from Hertel (Gay pass from Hertel)	USC 16–10
3	9:57	USC	Williams 27-yard pass from Hertel (kick failed)	USC 23–10
3		USC	Jordan 36-yard field goal	USC 26–10
3		UCLA	Owens 32-yard pass from Bashore (Carrol kick)	USC 26–17
4		UCLA	Carrol 20-yard field goal	USC 26–20
4	2:51	UCLA	Pederson 2-yard pass from Bashore (Carrol kick)	UCLA 27–26
4	:02	USC	Jordan 38-yard field goal	USC 29–27

== Roster ==
1977 USC Trojans football team roster
Players
Coaches
Offense

Pos.	#	Name	Class
OL		Gary Bethel
OL	71	Brad Budde	So
TE		Dan Burns
RB	21	Lynn Cain	Jr
RB		Rod Connors
RB		Dwight Ford
TE	86	William Gay	Sr
QB	6	Rob Hertel	Sr
G	66	Pat Howell	Jr
QB	16	Paul McDonald	So
OL	77	Anthony Munoz	So
OT	74	John Schuhmacher	Sr
TE	89	Joe Shipp	Sr
WR	18	Randy Simmrin	Sr
WR		Howard Studdard
WR	24	Calvin Sweeney	Jr
FB	36	Mosi Tatupu	Sr
OT	68	Keith Van Horne	So
RB	12	Charles White	So
WR	8	Kevin Williams	So

Defense

Pos.	#	Name	Class
DB	47	Larry Braziel	Jr
LB	58	Mario Celotto	Sr
LB	85	Garry Cobb	Jr
DB		Willie Crawford
DT	92	Rich Dimler	Jr
CB	40	Jeff Fisher	Fr
LB	50	Ed Gutierrez
DB		Carter Hartwig	Jr
LB	56	Dennis Johnson	So
DT	96	Myron Lapka	So
S	42	Ronnie Lott	Fr
LB	60	Clay Matthews	Sr
LB	58	Mike McDonald	Sr
LB	57	Larry McGrew	So
DB	33	Ricky Odom	Sr
LB	81	Eric Scoggins	Fr
DB	49	Dennis Smith	Fr
DL		Ty Sperling
DB	7	Dennis Thurman	Sr
DL		Walt Underwood

Special teams

Pos.	#	Name	Class
K		Frank Jordan

Head coach

- John Robinson

Coordinators/assistant coaches

Legend

- (C) Team captain
- (S) Suspended
- (I) Ineligible
- Injured
- Redshirt
