= Joe Steele (American football) =

American football player (born 1958)

No. 24 – Washington Huskies
- Position: Running back

Personal information
- Born: March 19, 1958 (age 68); Seattle, Washington, U.S.
- Listed height: 6 ft 4 in (1.93 m)
- Listed weight: 215 lb (98 kg)

Career information
- High school: Bishop Blanchet (Seattle)

Awards and highlights
- First-team All-Pac-10 (1979); 2× Second-team All-Pac-10 (1977, 1978)

Joe Steele (born March 19, 1958) is an American former football player and running back for the University of Washington Huskies from 1976 through 1979. During his college career, he set Husky records for most single season rushing yards, most career rushing yards, and most career touchdowns.

== Early life ==
Born and raised in Seattle, Washington, Steele attended Bishop Blanchet High School and graduated in 1976. As a running back, he helped lead Bishop Blanchet to a 23-game winning streak over three seasons and a state championship in 1974. In the 1975 Metro League championship game against undefeated Garfield, Steele rushed for 140 yards and two touchdowns, caught another touchdown, and threw for the game-winning score in the fourth overtime. During his high school career, he ran for 3,814 yards and scored 44 touchdowns.

== College career ==
Actively recruited by many strong programs, Steele stayed close to home and played for head coach Don James at the University of Washington in Seattle. As a sophomore in 1977, Steele rushed for 865 yards, scored fourteen touchdowns, and was named to the all-conference team. He led the Huskies in rushing in their 27–20 upset win over fourth-ranked Michigan in the Rose Bowl.

During his junior season in 1978, Steele set a Husky single season record with 1,111 rushing yards. As a senior in 1979, he suffered a season-ending injury to his right knee in the eighth game, a 34–14 road win over UCLA. Steele finished his college career with a Washington record 3,168 total rushing yards and was again named to the all-conference team. He was inducted into the Husky Hall of Fame in 1996.

== After college ==
Steele was selected 127th overall in the fifth round of the 1980 NFL draft by the Seattle Seahawks, but was released in the final cut. Following his football career, he worked in the commercial real estate business.

== See also ==
- Washington Huskies football statistical leaders
