= Michael Jackson (linebacker) =

American football player (born 1957)

No. 55
- Position: Linebacker

Personal information
- Born: July 15, 1957 (age 69); Pasco, Washington, U.S.
- Listed height: 6 ft 1 in (1.85 m)
- Listed weight: 220 lb (100 kg)

Career information
- High school: Pasco
- College: Washington
- NFL draft: 1979: 3rd round, 57th overall pick

Career history
- Seattle Seahawks (1979–1986)

Awards and highlights
- Second-team All-American (1978); Third-team All-American (1977); 2× First-team All-Pac-10 (1977, 1978); Washington MVP (1978)

Career NFL statistics
- Sacks: 7
- Fumble recoveries: 8
- Interceptions: 6
- Stats at Pro Football Reference

Michael Anthony Jackson (born July 15, 1957) is an American former professional football player who was a linebacker for eight seasons with the Seattle Seahawks of the National Football League (NFL). He played college football for the Washington Huskies.

== Early life ==
Born and raised in Pasco, Washington, Jackson is a 1975 graduate of Pasco High School, and has enjoyed greater success and accumulated more career achievements than any other Bulldog. A three-year/three-sport letterman, he was the team captain in both football and baseball while garnering All-State honors and receiving the Denning Award for Outstanding Athlete by the Pasco Jaycees as a senior.

At the University of Washington in Seattle, Jackson earned four varsity letters and was named to the UW All-Centennial team. He was also selected as the Inland Empire Amateur Athlete of the Year in 1977, a season in which he helped lead the Huskies to the Rose Bowl. The eyes of the nation were on him during that game as he made a vital end zone interception in the final two minutes that helped seal Washington's victory over favored Michigan.

Jackson holds several defensive school records for the Huskies, including single season (210) and career (569) tackles. Among the several honors he received for UW include Sports Illustrated Player of the Week (11-12-77), Husky team captain (1978), All-Pac-8 & Pac-10 (1977–78) and several All-American selections.

== NFL career ==
Jackson was selected by the Seahawks in the third round of the 1979 NFL draft, 57th overall, where he began an eight-year career as a starting linebacker. One of the team's all-time defensive greats, he led the Seahawks in tackles for a number of seasons and is among the career leaders in that category. He also earned 21 game balls for his outstanding play and has received numerous other awards including team MVP, Most Improved Player and the Seattle Post-Intelligencer’s Sports Star of the Year.

== After football ==
Jackson is active off the field with charities including the March of Dimes, Special Olympics, and the United Way. He has had 14 movie and television roles and was voted into the Pasco High School Hall of Fame in 1996.

== See also ==
- Washington Huskies football statistical leaders
