= 1977 UCLA Bruins football team =

American college football season

1977 UCLA Bruins football
- Conference: Pacific-8 Conference
- Record: 0–4, 7 wins forfeited (0–2 Pac-8, 5 wins forfeited)
- Head coach: Terry Donahue (2nd season)
- Defensive coordinator: Jed Hughes (1st season)
- Home stadium: Los Angeles Memorial Coliseum

1977 Pacific-8 Conference football standings
	Conf.					Overall
Team	W		L		T	W		L		T
No. 10 Washington $	6	–	1	–	0	8	–	4	–	0
No. 15 Stanford	5	–	2	–	0	9	–	3	–	0
No. 13 USC	5	–	2	–	0	8	–	4	–	0
California	3	–	4	–	0	7	–	4	–	0
Washington State	3	–	4	–	0	6	–	5	–	0
Oregon	1	–	6	–	0	2	–	9	–	0
Oregon State	0	–	7	–	0	2	–	9	–	0
UCLA †	0	–	2	–	0	0	–	4	–	0
$ – Conference champion; † – UCLA forfeited 7 wins (5 conference wins) due to ineligible players.; Rankings from AP Poll

The 1977 UCLA Bruins football team represented the University of California, Los Angeles during the 1977 NCAA Division I football season.

== Schedule ==
Note: UCLA's 7 wins were forfeited due to ineligible players.

Date	Opponent	Rank	Site	TV	Result	Attendance	Source
September 12	at No. 14 Houston*	No. 11	Houston Astrodome; Houston, TX	ABC	L 13–17	38,121	
September 17	Kansas*	No. 14	Los Angeles Memorial Coliseum; Los Angeles, CA		F 17–7	40,738	
September 24	at Minnesota*	No. 18	Memorial Stadium; Minneapolis, MN		L 13–27	41,076	
October 1	Iowa*		Los Angeles Memorial Coliseum; Los Angeles, CA		F 34–16	35,636	
October 8	at Stanford		Stanford Stadium; Stanford, CA		L 28–32	64,500	
October 15	at Washington State		Joe Albi Stadium; Spokane, WA		F 27–16	37,750	
October 22	No. 15 California		Los Angeles Memorial Coliseum; Los Angeles, CA		F 21–19	48,584	
October 29	Washington		Los Angeles Memorial Coliseum; Los Angeles, CA		F 20–12	38,692	
November 5	at Oregon		Autzen Stadium; Eugene, OR		F 21–3	20,000	
November 12	Oregon State		Los Angeles Memorial Coliseum; Los Angeles, CA		F 48–18	35,529	
November 25	at USC	No. 17	Los Angeles Memorial Coliseum; Los Angeles, CA (Victory Bell)	ABC	L 27–29	86,168	
*Non-conference game; Rankings from AP Poll released prior to the game

== Roster ==
1977 UCLA Bruins football team roster
Players
Coaches
Offense

Pos.	#	Name	Class
FB	27	Theotis Brown	Jr
OT	71	Bruce Davis	Jr
G	75	Max Montoya	Jr
RB	3	James Owens	Jr
G	66	John Tautolo	Fr

Defense

Pos.	#	Name	Class
CB	5	Kenny Easley	Fr
CB	23	Johnnie Lynn	Jr
LB	84	Jerry Robinson	Jr
LB	40	Manu Tuiasosopo	Jr

Special teams

Pos.	#	Name	Class
K, P	43	Frank Corral	Sr

Head coach

- Terry Donahue

Coordinators/assistant coaches

Legend

- (C) Team captain
- (S) Suspended
- (I) Ineligible
- Injured
- Redshirt

== Awards and honors ==
- All-American: Jerry Robinson (LB, consensus), Manu Tuiasosopo (DT, second team), Gus Coppens (OT, third team)
