= Nesby Glasgow =

American football player (1957–2020)

No. 25, 22
- Position: Safety

Personal information
- Born: April 15, 1957; Los Angeles, California, U.S.
- Died: February 25, 2020 (aged 62); Redmond, Washington, U.S.
- Listed height: 5 ft 10 in (1.78 m)
- Listed weight: 185 lb (84 kg)

Career information
- High school: Gardena (Los Angeles)
- College: Washington
- NFL draft: 1979: 8th round, 207th overall pick

Career history
- Baltimore/Indianapolis Colts (1979–1987); Seattle Seahawks (1988–1992)

Awards and highlights
- Third-team All-American (1978); 2× First-team All-Pac-8/Pac-10 (1977, 1978)

Career NFL statistics
- Interceptions: 15
- Fumble recoveries: 17
- Sacks: 10
- Stats at Pro Football Reference

Nesby Lee Glasgow (/ˈɡlæsɡoʊ/ GLAS-goh; April 15, 1957 – February 25, 2020) was an American professional football player who was a safety for 14 seasons in the National Football League (NFL) from 1979 to 1992. He played his first nine seasons with the Baltimore/Indianapolis Colts and the last five with the Seattle Seahawks.

Born and raised in Los Angeles, California, he played college football for the Washington Huskies in Seattle under head coach Don James. Glasgow was recognized as part of Washington's Century Team in 1990, and was inducted in the Husky Hall of Fame in 2001. His late red-zone interception helped clinch the Huskies' upset win over third-ranked Michigan in the 1978 Rose Bowl, was a team captain as a senior the following season. and was first-team all-conference in 1977 and 1978.

Glasgow was selected in the eighth round of the 1979 NFL draft by the Baltimore Colts, the 207th overall pick, started four games as a rookie, and became the starting free safety the next year. In his NFL career, he amassed ten sacks and fifteen interceptions for 189 yards. As a punt returner, he had 80 returns for 651 yards and 1 touchdown. As a kickoff returner, Glasgow had 85 returns for 1,906 yards. He was 1984 Defensive Player of the Year for the Colts and in 1990 for the Seahawks.

Glasgow died at age 62 in 2020 after a lengthy battle with stomach cancer, which started in his stomach and liver, was at stage 4, and had already spread outside its origin. He was interred at Greenwood Memorial Park in Renton, Washington.
