= Curt Stephenson =

American football player (born 1955)

Profile
- Position: Wide receiver

Personal information
- Born: October 30, 1955 (age 71); Detroit, Michigan, U.S.

Career information
- High school: La Jolla (CA)
- College: Michigan (1973–1977)

Career history
- Buffalo Bills (1978)*
- * Offseason or practice squad member only

Curtis J. Stephenson (born October 30, 1955) is an American former college football player. He played as a wide receiver for the Michigan Wolverines from 1973 through 1977 under head coach Bo Schembechler, appearing in multiple Big Ten championship seasons and bowl games. Stephenson later authored the 2008 memoir Those Who Stay, chronicling his years at Michigan and his experience as a walk-on athlete.

Stephenson was born in Detroit, Michigan, and raised in La Jolla, California. He attended La Jolla High School, where he was a letterman in five sports: football, soccer, volleyball, cross country, and track and field.

Stephenson joined the University of Michigan football program in 1973 as a walk-on. Under coach Bo Schembechler, he contributed to four Big Ten championship teams, one Orange Bowl, and two Rose Bowls. He was named Academic All–Big Ten in both 1976 and 1977. In the 1978 Rose Bowl against Washington, he caught a 76-yard touchdown pass, which stood as a Rose Bowl record for 45 years.

Following his collegiate career, Stephenson signed with the Buffalo Bills in 1978.
