= 1977 Washington State Cougars football team =

American college football season

1977 Washington State Cougars football
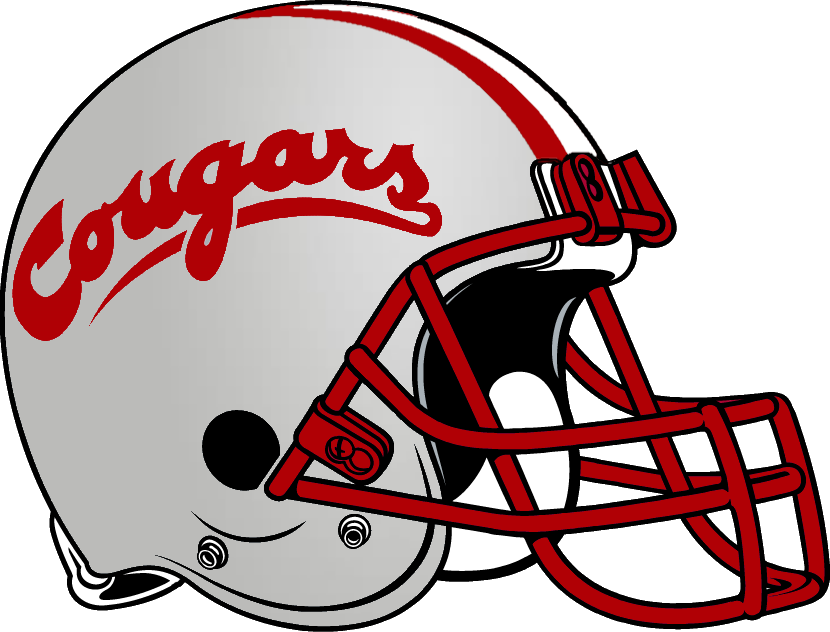
- Conference: Pacific-8 Conference
- Record: 7–4 (4–3 Pac-8)
- Head coach: Warren Powers (1st season)
- Home stadium: Martin Stadium, Joe Albi Stadium

1977 Pacific-8 Conference football standings
	Conf.					Overall
Team	W		L		T	W		L		T
No. 10 Washington $	6	–	1	–	0	8	–	4	–	0
No. 15 Stanford	5	–	2	–	0	9	–	3	–	0
No. 13 USC	5	–	2	–	0	8	–	4	–	0
California	3	–	4	–	0	7	–	4	–	0
Washington State	3	–	4	–	0	6	–	5	–	0
Oregon	1	–	6	–	0	2	–	9	–	0
Oregon State	0	–	7	–	0	2	–	9	–	0
UCLA †	0	–	2	–	0	0	–	4	–	0
$ – Conference champion; † – UCLA forfeited 7 wins (5 conference wins) due to ineligible players.; Rankings from AP Poll

The 1977 Washington State Cougars football team was an American football team that represented Washington State University in the Pacific-8 Conference (Pac-8) during the 1977 NCAA Division I football season. In their only season under head coach Warren Powers, the Cougars compiled a 7–4 record (4–3 in Pac-8, tied for fourth), and outscored their opponents 263 to 236.

The team's statistical leaders included Jack Thompson with 2,372 passing yards, Dan Doornink with 591 rushing yards, and Mike Levenseller with 736 receiving yards.

The Cougars opened the season with an upset win at fifteenth-ranked Nebraska.

Previously an assistant with the Huskers, Powers left after just twelve months in Pullman for Missouri of the Big Eight Conference. His predecessor in 1976, Jackie Sherrill, also lasted just one season with the Cougars. Offensive backfield coach Jim Walden was promoted to head coach less than a week later, and led the WSU program for nine years.

== Schedule ==
Date	Opponent	Rank	Site	Result	Attendance	Source
September 10	at No. 15 Nebraska*		Memorial Stadium; Lincoln, NE	W 19–10	75,922	
September 17	at Michigan State*		Spartan Stadium; East Lansing, MI	W 23–21	50,263	
September 24	at Kansas*	No. 15	Memorial Stadium; Lawrence, KS	L 12–14	44,540	
September 30	at No. 2 USC		Los Angeles Memorial Coliseum; Los Angeles, CA	L 7–41	61,809	
October 8	No. 14 California^{†}		Martin Stadium; Pullman, WA	W 17–10	27,500	
October 15	UCLA		Joe Albi Stadium; Spokane, WA	W 16–20 (UCLA forfeit)	37,750	
October 22	at Stanford		Stanford Stadium; Stanford, CA	L 29–31	47,500	
October 29	Oregon		Martin Stadium; Pullman, WA	W 56–20	27,200	
November 5	at Oregon State		Parker Stadium; Corvallis, OR	W 24–10	22,657	
November 12	Idaho*		Martin Stadium; Pullman, WA (Battle of the Palouse)	W 45–17	18,500	
November 19	at No. 19 Washington		Husky Stadium; Seattle, WA (Apple Cup)	L 15–35	60,964	
*Non-conference game; ^{†}Homecoming; Rankings from AP Poll released prior to the game

^1 UCLA later forfeited the game due to fielding an ineligible player.

== Roster ==
1977 Washington State Cougars football team roster
Players
Coaches
Offense

Pos.	#	Name	Class
C	79	Noel Barnes	Sr
SE	13	Bob Bratkowski	Sr
TE	88	Ron Bull	Jr
C	77	Mark Chandless	Jr
RB	11	Dan Doornink	Sr
RB	29	Tali Ena	So
G	71	Larry Finan	Sr
RB	25	Harold Gillum	Jr
QB	18	Steve Grant	Jr
TE	81	Gus Hobus	Jr
FL	44	Brian Kelly	Sr
G	65	Tom Larsen	Sr
OT	68	Dave Lemke	Sr
SE	21	Mike Levenseller	Sr
TE	83	Eason Ramson	Sr
QB	14	Jack Thompson	Jr
TB	26	Mike Washington	Fr
OT	59	Barry Zanck	Sr

Defense

Pos.	#	Name	Class
DT	91	Terry Anderson	Sr
LB	96	Raleigh Fletcher	Jr
DT	63	Mike Galovich	Jr
LB	98	Terry Gilmore	Jr
CB	37	Ken Greene	Sr
FS	28	Bob Gregor	So
DT	76	Spud Harris	So
LB	57	Don Hover	Sr
LB	97	Jeff Jones	Jr
CB	15	Mark Patterson	Sr
LB	67	Dean Pedigo	Sr
LB	47	Scott Pelluer	Fr
DE	38	Mel Sanders	So
SS	48	Don Schwartz	Sr
DE	36	Tom Thompson	Jr
FS	16	John Troppman	Sr
NG	50	George Yarno	Jr

Special teams

Pos.	#	Name	Class
K	22	Paul Watson	Jr
P	46	Gavin Hedrick	Sr

Head coach

- Warren Powers (1st year)

Coordinators/assistant coaches

- Jim Walden – (OB)
- Mike Price – (WR)
- Dick Beechner – (OL)
- Dave Walker – (DL)
- Rich Glover – (DL)
- John Faiman – (OL)
- Michael Church – (LB)
- Zaven Yaralian – (DB)

Legend

- (C) Team captain
- (S) Suspended
- (I) Ineligible
- Injured
- Redshirt

== NFL draft ==
Eight Cougars were selected in the 1978 NFL draft; Ken Greene was the first player from Washington State taken in the first round in 13 years.

Player	Position	Round	Overall	Franchise
Ken Greene	DB	1	19	St. Louis Cardinals
Don Schwartz	DB	4	87	New Orleans Saints
Mike Levenseller	WR	6	164	Oakland Raiders
Dan Doornink	RB	7	174	New York Giants
Don Hover	LB	8	219	Washington Redskins
Gavin Hendrick	P	8	220	San Diego Chargers
Eason Ramson	TE	12	312	Green Bay Packers
Mark Patterson	DB	12	318	Detroit Lions
