= 1976 All-Pacific-8 Conference football team =

The 1976 All-Pacific-8 Conference football team consists of American football players chosen by various organizations for All-Pacific-8 Conference teams for the 1976 NCAA Division I football season.

== Offensive selections ==
=== Quarterbacks ===
- Jack Thompson, Washington State (Coaches-1)
- Joe Roth, California (Coaches-2)

=== Running backs ===
- Ricky Bell, USC (Coaches-1)
- Theotis Brown, UCLA (Coaches-1)
- Robin Earl, Washington (Coaches-2)
- Wendell Tyler, UCLA (Coaches-2)

=== Wide receivers ===
- Tony Hill, Stanford (Coaches-1)
- Mike Levenseller, Washington State (Coaches-1)
- Wesley Walker, California (Coaches-2)
- Greg Bauer, Oregon (Coaches-2)

=== Tight ends ===
- Rick Walker, UCLA (Coaches-1)
- William Gay, USC (Coaches-2)

=== Tackles ===
- Marvin Powell, USC (Coaches-1)
- Ted Albrecht, California (Coaches-1)
- Gus Coppens, UCLA (Coaches-2)
- Rob Kezirian, UCLA (Coaches-2)

=== Guards ===
- Donnie Hickman, USC (Coaches-1)
- Alex Karakozoff, USC (Coaches-1)
- Greg Taylor, UCLA (Coaches-2)
- Keith Eck, UCLA (Coaches-2)

=== Centers ===
- Duane Williams, California (Coaches-1)
- Mitch Kahn, UCLA (Coaches-2)

== Defensive selections ==
=== Down linemen ===
- Gary Jeter, USC (Coaches-1)
- Duncan McColl, Stanford (Coaches-1)
- Charles Jackson, Washington (Coaches-1)
- Manu Tuiasosopo, UCLA (Coaches-1)
- Dennis Boyd, Oregon State (Coaches-2)
- Walt Underwood, USC (Coaches-2)
- Bob Warner, California (Coaches-2)

=== Linebackers ===
- Dave Lewis, USC (Coaches-1)
- Rod Martin, USC (Coaches-1)
- Jerry Robinson, UCLA (Coaches-1)
- Clay Matthews Jr., USC (Coaches-1)
- Raymond Burks, UCLA (Coaches-2)
- Frank Stephens, UCLA (Coaches-2)
- Gordy Ceresino, Stanford (Coaches-2)
- Phil Heck, California (Coaches-2)

=== Defensive backs ===
- Oscar Edwards, UCLA (Coaches-1)
- Jay Locey, Oregon State (Coaches-1)
- Dennis Thurman, USC (Coaches-1)
- Levi Armstrong, UCLA (Coaches-1)
- Clint Strozier, USC (Coaches-2)
- Rich Waters, Stanford (Coaches-2)
- Ricky Odom, USC (Coaches-2)
- Anthony Green, California (Coaches-2)

== Special teams ==
=== Placekicker ===
- Jim Breech, California (Coaches-1)
- Frank Corral, UCLA (Coaches-2)

=== Punter ===
- Frank Corral, UCLA (Coaches-1)
- Gavin Hendrick, Washington State (Coaches-2)

== Key ==
Coaches = selected by the eight conference head coaches

== See also ==
- 1976 College Football All-America Team
