= 1978 All-America college football team =

Official list of the best college football players of 1978

The 1978 All-America college football team is composed of college football players who were selected as All-Americans by various organizations and writers that chose College Football All-America Teams in 1978. The National Collegiate Athletic Association (NCAA) recognizes four selectors as "official" for the 1978 season. They are: (1) the American Football Coaches Association (AFCA) based on the input of more than 2,000 voting members; (2) the Associated Press (AP) selected based on the votes of sports writers at AP newspapers; (3) the Football Writers Association of America (FWAA) selected by the nation's football writers; and (4) the United Press International (UPI) selected based on the votes of sports writers at UPI newspapers. Other selectors included Football News (FN), the Newspaper Enterprise Association (NEA), The Sporting News (TSN), and the Walter Camp Football Foundation (WC).

== Offense ==
=== Receivers ===
- Emanuel Tolbert, SMU (AP-1, FWAA, UPI-2, NEA-2, WC)
- Kirk Gibson, Michigan State (AP-2, UPI-1, NEA-1, TSN)
- Gordon Jones, Pittsburgh (AFCA [split end], AP-2, NEA-1 [flanker])
- Jerry Butler, Clemson (AP-1, NEA-2 [flanker], TSN)
- Junior Miller, Nebraska (AP-3)
- Dave Petzke, Northern Illinois (AP-3)

=== Tight ends ===
- Kellen Winslow, Missouri (AFCA, UPI-1, NEA-1, TSN, WC)
- Mark Brammer, Michigan State (FWAA, UPI-2, NEA-2)

=== Tackles ===
- Keith Dorney, Penn St. (AFCA, AP-1, FWAA, UPI-1, NEA-1, TSN, WC)
- Kelvin Clark, Nebraska (AFCA, AP-1, FWAA, NEA-2, WC)
- Jeff Toews, Washington (AP-2, UPI-2, NEA-1, TSN)
- Matt Miller, Colorado (UPI-1)
- Robert Dugas, LSU (AP-2, NEA-2)
- Anthony Muñoz, USC (UPI-2)
- Greg Kolenda, Arkansas (AP-3)
- Craig Wolfley, Syracuse (AP-3)

=== Guards ===
- Pat Howell, USC (AFCA, AP-1, FWAA, UPI-1, NEA-1, TSN, WC)
- Greg Roberts, Oklahoma (AFCA, AP-1, FWAA, UPI-1, NEA-1, TSN, WC)
- Joe Bostic, Clemson (AP-2, UPI-2, NEA-2)
- Pete Inge, San Diego State (AP-2)
- Steve Lindquist, Nebraska (AP-3, UPI-2)
- Brad Budde, USC (NEA-2)
- Doug Panfil, Tulsa (AP-3)

=== Centers ===
- Dave Huffman, Notre Dame (AP-2, FWAA, UPI-1, NEA-1, TSN, WC)
- Jim Ritcher, North Carolina St. (AFCA, AP-1)
- Dwight Stephenson, Alabama (UPI-2)
- Robert Shaw, Tennessee (NEA-2)
- Chuck Brown, Houston (AP-3)

=== Quarterbacks ===
- Chuck Fusina, Penn St. (AFCA-t, AP-1, FWAA, UPI-1, NEA-1, WC)
- Rick Leach, Michigan (AFCA-t, AP-2, UPI-2)
- Jack Thompson, Washington State (TSN)
- Steve Dils, Stanford (NEA-2)
- Steve Fuller, Clemson (AP-3)

=== Running backs ===
- Billy Sims, Oklahoma (AFCA, AP-1, FWAA, UPI-1, NEA-1, TSN, WC)
- Charles Alexander, LSU (AFCA, AP-2, FWAA, UPI-2, NEA-1, TSN, WC)
- Charles White, USC (AFCA, AP-1, FWAA, UPI-1, NEA-2, WC)
- Ted Brown, North Carolina State (AP-1, UPI-1, NEA-2)
- Eddie Lee Ivery, Georgia Tech (AP-2, UPI-2)
- Darrin Nelson, Stanford (AP-2)
- Willie McClendon, Georgia (UPI-2)
- Obie Graves, Cal State Fullerton (AP-3)
- James Hadnot, Texas Tech (AP-3)
- Joseph H. Holland, Cornell (AP-3)

== Defense ==
=== Defensive ends ===
- Al Harris, Arizona St. (AP-1, UPI-1, NEA-1, WC, AFCA, FWAA, TSN)
- Hugh Green, Pittsburgh (AP-1, UPI-1, NEA-2, WC)
- Don Smith, Miami (Fla.) (AFCA, NEA-2, TSN)
- George Andrews, Nebraska (AP-2, UPI-2, NEA-1)
- Don Blackmon, Tulsa (AP-2)
- Willie Jones, Florida State (UPI-2)
- John Adams, LSU (AP-3)
- Chuck Schott, Army (AP-3)

=== Defensive tackles ===
- Mike Bell, Colorado St. (AFCA, AP-2, FWAA, UPI-2, NEA-1, TSN, WC)
- Bruce Clark, Penn St. (AFCA, AP-1, FWAA, UPI-1, NEA-2)
- Marty Lyons, Alabama (AP-1, FWAA, UPI-2, NEA-1, TSN)
- Matt Millen, Penn State (UPI-1, NEA-2, WC)
- Dan Hampton, Arkansas (AFCA)
- Jimmy Walker, Arkansas (AP-3, FWAA)
- Mike Stensrud, Iowa State (AP-2)
- Ken Kremer, Ball State (AP-3)

=== Middle guards ===
- Reggie Kinlaw, Oklahoma (AP-2, UPI-1, WC)
- Manu Tuiasosopo, UCLA (UPI-2)
- Ardis McCann, Louisiana Tech (AP-3)

=== Linebackers ===
- Jerry Robinson, UCLA (AFCA, AP-1, FWAA, UPI-1, NEA-1, WC, TSN)
- Tom Cousineau, Ohio State (AP-1, UPI-1, NEA-1, WC, AFCA, TSN)
- Bob Golic, Notre Dame (AFCA, AP-1, FWAA, UPI-1, NEA-2, WC)
- Ken Fantetti, Wyoming (AP-3, FWAA)
- Barry Krauss, Alabama (AP-2, UPI-2, TSN)
- George Cumby, Oklahima (NEA-1)
- John Corker, Ohlahoma State (AP-1)
- Daryl Hunt, Oklahoma (AP-2, UPI-2)
- Michael Jackson, Washington (AP-2, UPI-2, NEA-2)
- Joe Norman, Indiana (NEA-2)
- Jack Lazor, Kent State (AP-3)
- Frank Manumaleuga, San Jose State (AP-3)

=== Defensive backs ===
- Johnnie Johnson, Texas (AFCA, AP-1, FWAA, UPI-1, NEA-1, WC)
- Kenny Easley, UCLA (AP-1, FWAA, UPI-1, NEA-1, TSN, WC)
- Jeff Nixon, Richmond (AFCA, AP-1, FWAA, UPI-2, NEA-1, WC)
- Lawrence Johnson, Wisconsin (NEA-1, TSN)
- Henry Williams, San Diego St. (AFCA, UPI-2)
- Rick Sanford, South Carolina (TSN)
- Pete Harris, Penn State (AP-2, UPI-1, NEA-2)
- Don Bessillieu, Georgia Tech (TSN)
- Jeff Delaney, Pittsburgh (AP-2, UPI-2)
- Lovie Smith, Tulsa (AP-2)
- Russ Calabrese, Missouri (NEA-2)
- Tim Smith, Oregon State (NEA-2)
- Vaughn Lusby, Arkansas (NEA-2)
- Jason Coloma, Brigham Young (AP-3)
- Nesby Glasgow, Washington (AP-3)
- Joe Restic, Notre Dame (AP-3)

== Special teams ==
=== Kickers ===
- Matt Bahr, Penn State (UPI-1, NEA-1, TSN)
- Tony Franklin, Texas A&M (FWAA, UPI-2, NEA-2)

=== Punters ===
- Russell Erxleben, Texas (NEA-1, WC, FWAA, TSN)
- Joe Restic, Notre Dame (NEA-2)

== Key ==
- **Bold** – Consensus All-American
- -1 – First-team selection
- -2 – Second-team selection
- -3 – Third-team selection

=== Official selectors ===
- AFCA – American Football Coaches Association, selected by 2,100 voting members for Kodak
- AP – Associated Press
- FWAA – Football Writers Association of America
- UPI – United Press International

=== Other selectors ===
- FN – Football News
- NEA – Newspaper Enterprise Association
- TSN – The Sporting News
- WC – Walter Camp Football Foundation

== See also ==
- 1978 All-Atlantic Coast Conference football team
- 1978 All-Big Eight Conference football team
- 1978 All-Big Ten Conference football team
- 1978 All-Pacific-10 Conference football team
- 1978 All-SEC football team
- 1978 All-Southwest Conference football team
