= Guy Benjamin =

American football player (born 1955)

No. 7, 10
- Position: Quarterback

Personal information
- Born: June 27, 1955 (age 71); Los Angeles, California, U.S.
- Listed height: 6 ft 4 in (1.93 m)
- Listed weight: 210 lb (95 kg)

Career information
- High school: James Monroe (North Hills, California)
- College: Stanford
- NFL draft: 1978: 2nd round, 51st overall pick

Career history
- Miami Dolphins (1978–1979); New Orleans Saints (1980); San Francisco 49ers (1981–1983)

Awards and highlights
- Super Bowl champion (XVI); Sammy Baugh Trophy (1977); Consensus All-American (1977); Pac-8 Co-Player of the Year (1977); Pop Warner Trophy (1977); First-team All-Pac-8 (1977)

Career NFL statistics
- TD–INT: 3-3
- Passing yards: 439
- Passer rating: 73.1
- Pass attempts: 68
- Pass completions: 39
- Games played: 19
- Stats at Pro Football Reference

Guy Emory Benjamin (born June 27, 1955) is an American former professional football player who was a quarterback for six seasons in the National Football League (NFL). He played college football for the Stanford Cardinals (now Cardinal), earning consensus All-American honors in 1977. Benjamin was selected in the second round of the 1978 NFL draft. He won a Super Bowl as a backup quarterback with the San Francisco 49ers in January 1982.

== College career ==
Benjamin played football at James Monroe High School in North Hills, California, and matriculated at Stanford University in 1974. He split starting time with Mike Cordova at first, but took over as full-time starter in 1976. In 1977 under head coach Bill Walsh, Benjamin led Stanford to a 24–14 victory over LSU in the Sun Bowl and won both the Sammy Baugh Trophy (top passer in college football) and the W.J. Voit Memorial Trophy, (outstanding college football player on the Pacific Coast).

== Professional career ==
Benjamin was selected by the Miami Dolphins in the second round of the 1978 NFL draft. He played two seasons behind Bob Griese and Don Strock, then spent one season as Archie Manning's backup with the New Orleans Saints. He was reunited with Bill Walsh when he joined the San Francisco 49ers in 1981, where he earned a Super Bowl ring as Joe Montana's backup in Super Bowl XVI. He retired in 1984 following surgery.

== After football ==
After leaving football, Benjamin directed Athletes United for Peace, an organization founded by Olympic athletes after the U.S. boycott of the 1980 Moscow Olympics. He also founded the Sports in Society Institute at the New College of California, and directed its degree-completion program for former student-athletes.

He now lives in Hawaii, where he was offensive coordinator for the University of Hawaii football team for a while. In 1988, he was to be the head coach of the World Indoor Football League's Las Vegas Aces, but that league folded before it could get off the ground and the Aces' bid to join the Arena Football League was turned away, so that the Aces never played a game. He also coached the Hawaii Hammerheads of the Indoor Professional Football League to the league championship in 1999, the team's only season. He then became the first head coach of the IPFL's Portland Prowlers before returning to Hawaii, where he coached the minor league Hawaiian Islanders of the Arena Football League af2.

As of 2012, he is Executive Director of the Hawaii Medical College.
