= 1977 Oregon Ducks football team =

American college football season

1977 Oregon Ducks football
- Conference: Pacific-8 Conference
- Record: 3–8 (2–5 Pac-8)
- Head coach: Rich Brooks (1st season)
- Offensive coordinator: John Becker (1st season)
- Defensive coordinator: Howard Tippett (1st season)
- Captain: Game captains
- Home stadium: Autzen Stadium

1977 Pacific-8 Conference football standings
	Conf.					Overall
Team	W		L		T	W		L		T
No. 10 Washington $	6	–	1	–	0	8	–	4	–	0
No. 15 Stanford	5	–	2	–	0	9	–	3	–	0
No. 13 USC	5	–	2	–	0	8	–	4	–	0
California	3	–	4	–	0	7	–	4	–	0
Washington State	3	–	4	–	0	6	–	5	–	0
Oregon	1	–	6	–	0	2	–	9	–	0
Oregon State	0	–	7	–	0	2	–	9	–	0
UCLA †	0	–	2	–	0	0	–	4	–	0
$ – Conference champion; † – UCLA forfeited 7 wins (5 conference wins) due to ineligible players.; Rankings from AP Poll

The 1977 Oregon Ducks football team represented the University of Oregon during the 1977 NCAA Division I football season. Oregon was a member of the Pac-8 Conference and home games were played at Autzen Stadium in Eugene. Led by first-year head coach Rich Brooks, Oregon was 3–8 overall and 2–5 in conference play due to a forfeit by UCLA.

== Schedule ==
Date	Time	Opponent	Site	Result	Attendance	Source
September 10		at No. 19 Georgia*	Sanford Stadium; Athens, GA	L 16–27	45,000	
September 17		at TCU*	Amon G. Carter Stadium; Fort Worth, TX	W 29–24	15,031	
September 24		Wisconsin*	Autzen Stadium; Eugene, OR	L 10–22	30,750	
October 1	1:50 pm	at Stanford	Stanford Stadium; Stanford, CA	L 10–20	36,500	
October 8	1:30 pm	Washington	Autzen Stadium; Eugene, OR (rivalry)	L 0–54	29,500	
October 15	1:30 pm	at No. 6 USC	Los Angeles Memorial Coliseum; Los Angeles, CA	L 15–33	51,120	
October 22	5:30 pm	at LSU*	Tiger Stadium; Baton Rouge, LA	L 17–56	59,017	
October 29	1:00 pm	at Washington State	Martin Stadium; Pullman, WA	L 20–56	27,200	
November 5	1:30 pm	UCLA	Autzen Stadium; Eugene, OR	W 3–21 (UCLA forfeit)	20,000	
November 12	1:30 pm	California	Autzen Stadium; Eugene, OR	L 16–48	15,000	
November 19	1:30 pm	Oregon State	Autzen Stadium; Eugene, OR (Civil War)	W 28–16	34,068	
*Non-conference game; Rankings from AP Poll released prior to the game

== Game summaries ==
=== Oregon State ===
Team	1	2	3	4	Total
Oregon State	0	10	0	6	16
• Oregon	7	21	0	0	28

- Date: November 19
- Location: Autzen Stadium, Eugene, OR
- Game attendance: 34,068

Scoring summary
1	12:15	ORE	Nutting 1 yard run (Geiger kick)	ORE 7-0
2	12:51	ORE	Nutting 1 yard run (Geiger kick)	ORE 14-0
2	7:03	OSU	Walford 34 yard field goal	ORE 14-3
2	5:42	ORE	Bullock 4 yard run (Geiger kick)	ORE 21-3
2	1:44	ORE	Cafferty 12 yard pass from Henderson (Geiger kick)	ORE 28-3
2	0:25	OSU	Fields 1 yard run (Walford kick)	ORE 28-10
4	12:28	OSU	Kahoonei 1 yard run (pass failed)	ORE 28-16

== Roster ==
1977 Oregon Ducks football team roster
Players
Coaches
Offense

Pos.	#	Name	Class
RB	44	Gary Beck	Fr
QB	13	Jack Henderson	Sr
WR	89	Ken Page	Jr
C	51	Fred Quillan	Sr

Defense

Pos.	#	Name	Class
LB	45	Bruce Beekley	Jr
LB	56	Tim Beyer	Jr
LB	39	Willie Blasher	Jr
DB	10	Kenny Bryant	Jr
DT	92	Terry Dion	So
DE	90	Neil Elshire	So
DT	63	Vince Goldsmith	Fr
DB	4	Reggie Grant	Sr

Special teams

Pos.	#	Name	Class
K, P	3	Roy Geiger	Sr

Head coach

- Rich Brooks (1st year)

Coordinators/assistant coaches

- John Becker (OC)
- Howard Tippett (DC)
- Ron Hudson (RB, WR)
- A. J. Christoff (OLB)
- Milt Jackson (DB)
- Bob McCray (OL)
- Joe Schaffeld (LB)
- Bill Tarrow (OL)

Legend

- (C) Team captain
- (S) Suspended
- (I) Ineligible
- Injured
- Redshirt
