= Don Hover =

American farmer, football player, and politician (born 1954)

Director of the Washington State Department of Agriculture
- In office April 1, 2013 – April 26, 2015
- Governor: Jay Inslee
- Preceded by: Dan Newhouse
- Succeeded by: Derek Sandison

Okanogan County Commissioner
- In office January 1, 2005 – January 1, 2013
- Succeeded by: Ray Campbell

Personal details
- Born: December 13, 1954 (age 71) Seattle, Washington, U.S.
- Party: Republican
- Education: Washington State University (BS); University of Washington (MPA)

Don Hover
No. 58
- Position: Linebacker

Personal information
- Listed height: 6 ft 2 in (1.88 m)
- Listed weight: 225 lb (102 kg)

Career information
- High school: Issaquah (WA)
- College: Washington State
- NFL draft: 1978: 8th round, 219th overall pick

Career history
- Washington Redskins (1978–1979)

Awards and highlights
- Second-team All-Pac-8 (1977)
- Stats at Pro Football Reference

Donald R. "Bud" Hover (born December 13, 1954) is an American farmer, politician, and former football linebacker in the National Football League. He played college football at Washington State University, was selected in the eighth round of the 1978 NFL draft, and played two seasons in the NFL.

== Early life and education ==
Born in Seattle, Washington, and raised in the east suburb of Issaquah, Washington, Hover graduated from Issaquah High School in 1973. He earned a Bachelor of Science degree in agriculture education, forest, and range management from Washington State University and a master's degree in public administration from the University of Washington.

== Career ==
A member of the Republican Party, Hover served two terms as commissioner of Okanogan County, Washington. In 2012, he lost re-election by ten votes. Governor Jay Inslee, a Democrat, then appointed Hover to serve as director of the Washington State Department of Agriculture. Hover resigned as agriculture director in 2015.
