= Keith Eck =

American football player (born 1955)

No. 58
- Position: Offensive lineman

Personal information
- Born: November 28, 1955 (age 70); Newport Beach, California, U.S.

Career information
- High school: Crespi Carmelite (Encino, California)
- College: UCLA

Career history
- Washington Redskins (1977); New York Giants (1979)

Awards and highlights
- Second-team All-Pac-8 (1976)

Career statistics
- Games played: 13
- Games started: 13
- Stats at Pro Football Reference

Keith Eck (born November 28, 1955) is a former offensive lineman who played one season for the New York Giants of the National Football League. He played college football at UCLA.

== Early life ==
Eck attended Crespi Carmelite High School in Encino, California where he played baseball and football. As a senior, he was voted the El Camino Real League's most valuable lineman and earned recognition from the United Savings Helms Athletic Foundation of All Southern California High School Football First-team. IN 2008 he was inducted into the Crespi Athletic Hall of Fame.

== College ==
At the University of California, Los Angeles, Eck played center and guard. As a senior, he was Second-team All-Pac-8 as well as receiving the UCLA award for most improved player.

== Professional career ==
In 1977 Eck played for the Washington Redskins professional football team, but was placed on injured reserve for the 1977 season. The following year, he returned to UCLA to coach the offensive tackles and tight-ends. In 1979 Eck played for the New York Giants, backing up Jim Clack at center as well as being the special teams snapper for punts and field goals.

In 1980 his football career ended abruptly when he suffered a heart attack on an airplane en route to his first pre-season training camp for his second year with the New York Giants.

== Personal life ==
After football, Eck has worked in the financial services industry, and in 1990 founded his own financial and insurance company.
