= 1977 Oregon State Beavers football team =

American college football season

1977 Oregon State Beavers football
- Conference: Pacific-8 Conference
- Record: 3–8 (1–6 Pac-8)
- Head coach: Craig Fertig (2nd season)
- Offensive coordinator: Tony Kopay (2nd season)
- Defensive coordinator: Ray Braun (2nd season)
- Home stadium: Parker Stadium

1977 Pacific-8 Conference football standings
| | Conf. | | | | | Overall |
| Team | W | | L | | T | W | | L | | T |
|---|---|---|---|---|---|---|---|---|---|---|
| No. 10 Washington $ | 6 | – | 1 | – | 0 | 8 | – | 4 | – | 0 |
| No. 15 Stanford | 5 | – | 2 | – | 0 | 9 | – | 3 | – | 0 |
| No. 13 USC | 5 | – | 2 | – | 0 | 8 | – | 4 | – | 0 |
| California | 3 | – | 4 | – | 0 | 7 | – | 4 | – | 0 |
| Washington State | 3 | – | 4 | – | 0 | 6 | – | 5 | – | 0 |
| Oregon | 1 | – | 6 | – | 0 | 2 | – | 9 | – | 0 |
| Oregon State | 0 | – | 7 | – | 0 | 2 | – | 9 | – | 0 |
| UCLA † | 0 | – | 2 | – | 0 | 0 | – | 4 | – | 0 |
$ – Conference champion; † – UCLA forfeited 7 wins (5 conference wins) due to ineligible players.; Rankings from AP Poll

The 1977 Oregon State Beavers football team represented Oregon State University as a member of the Pacific-8 Conference (Pac-8) during the 1977 NCAA Division I football season. In their second season under head coach Craig Fertig, the Beavers compiled an overall record of 2–9 with a mark of 0–7 in conference play, placing last out of eight teams in the Pac-8,, and were outscored 303 to 173. The team played its five home games on campus at Parker Stadium in Corvallis.

== Schedule ==
| Date | Opponent | Site | Result | Attendance | Source |
|---|---|---|---|---|---|
| September 10 | Syracuse* | Parker Stadium; Corvallis, OR | W 24–12 | 20,540 | |
| September 17 | No. 2 USC | Parker Stadium; Corvallis, OR | L 10–17 | 31,143 | |
| September 24 | at Arizona State* | Sun Devil Stadium; Tempe, AZ | L 31–33 | 57,535 | |
| October 1 | at Tennessee* | Neyland Stadium; Knoxville, TN | L 10–41 | 82,865 | |
| October 8 | No. 13 BYU* | Parker Stadium; Corvallis, OR | W 24–19 | 33,965 | |
| October 15 | at No. 20 California | California Memorial Stadium; Berkeley, CA | L 17–41 | 33,400 | |
| October 22 | at Washington | Husky Stadium; Seattle, WA | L 6–14 | 46,677 | |
| October 29 | Stanford | Parker Stadium; Corvallis, OR | L 7–26 | 20,196 | |
| November 5 | Washington State | Parker Stadium; Corvallis, OR | L 10–24 | 22,657 | |
| November 12 | at UCLA | Los Angeles Memorial Coliseum; Los Angeles, CA | W 18–48 (UCLA forfeit) | 35,529 | |
| November 19 | at Oregon | Autzen Stadium; Eugene, OR (Civil War) | L 16–28 | 34,068 | |
*Non-conference game; Rankings from AP Poll released prior to the game

== Roster ==
1977 Oregon State Beavers football team roster
Players
Coaches
Offense

| Pos. | # | Name | Class |
|---|---|---|---|
| TE | 90 | Terry Beck | Fr |
| WR | 44 | Steve Coury | So |
| G | 64 | Kevin Donaghue | So |
| RB | 32 | James Fields | Jr |
| WR | 7 | Dwayne Hall | Sr |
| QB | 12 | Jeff Hammermeister | Sr |
| OT | 70 | Gordy Neumann | Sr |
| QB | 19 | John Norman | Jr |
| C | 58 | Jim Walker | Sr |
| OT | 74 | Vern Ward | Sr |
| QB | 17 | Dave White | Sr |
| G | 63 | Larry Winkler | Sr |

Defense

| Pos. | # | Name | Class |
|---|---|---|---|
| LB | 57 | Gene Dales | Sr |
| DB | 24 | Rob Emmons | So |
| DT | 72 | Troy Guscik | Sr |
| CB | 34 | Lenny Holmes | Jr |
| CB | 23 | Kerry Justin | Sr |
| DT | 66 | Greg Marshall | Sr |
| LB | 59 | Kent Peyton | Jr |
| DL | 61 | Tom Schillinger | So |
| DE | 93 | Clarence Smithey | Sr |
| FS | 25 | Dan Wells | So |
| DT | 88 | Jerry Wilkinson | Sr |

Special teams

| Pos. | # | Name | Class |

Head coach

- Craig Fertig (2nd year)

Coordinators/assistant coaches

- Tony Kopay (OC)
- Ray Braun (DC)

Legend

- (C) Team captain
- (S) Suspended
- (I) Ineligible
- Injured
- Redshirt
