= Gus Coppens =

American football player (born 1955)

No. 78
- Position: Offensive tackle

Personal information
- Born: February 7, 1955 (age 71); Lynwood, California, U.S.
- Listed height: 6 ft 5 in (1.96 m)
- Listed weight: 270 lb (122 kg)

Career information
- High school: Fullerton (CA) Sunny Hills
- College: UCLA
- NFL draft: 1978: 12th round, 330 (by the Los Angeles Rams)th overall pick

Career history
- Los Angeles Rams (1978)*; New York Giants (1979); Los Angeles Express (1983-1984)
- * Offseason or practice squad member only

Awards and highlights
- First-team All-Pac-8 (1977); Second-team All-Pac-8 (1976)

Career NFL statistics
- Games played: 9
- Games started: 7
- Stats at Pro Football Reference

Gus Coppens (born February 7, 1955) is an American former professional football player who was a tackle for the New York Giants of the National Football League (NFL) in 1979. Coppens played college football for the UCLA Bruins and was selected 330th overall by the Los Angeles Rams in the 12th round of the 1978 NFL draft.
