= Charles White (American football) =

American football player and coach (1958–2023)

No. 25, 33
- Position: Running back

Personal information
- Born: January 22, 1958; Los Angeles, California, U.S.
- Died: January 11, 2023 (aged 64); Newport Beach, California, U.S.
- Listed height: 5 ft 10 in (1.78 m)
- Listed weight: 190 lb (86 kg)

Career information
- High school: San Fernando (San Fernando, California)
- College: USC (1976–1979)
- NFL draft: 1980: 1st round, 27th overall pick

Career history

Playing
- Cleveland Browns (1980–1984); Los Angeles Rams (1985–1988)

Coaching
- USC (1993–1997) Running backs coach

Awards and highlights
- NFL Comeback Player of the Year (1987); First-team All-Pro (1987); Pro Bowl (1987); NFL rushing yards leader (1987); NFL rushing touchdowns co-leader (1987); National champion (1978); Heisman Trophy (1979); 2× Unanimous All-American (1978, 1979); 2× Pac-10 Player of the Year (1978, 1979); 3× First-team All-Pac-10 (1977–1979); USC Trojans No. 12 retired

Career NFL statistics
- Rushing yards: 3,075
- Rushing average: 3.9
- Rushing touchdowns: 23
- Receptions: 114
- Receiving yards: 860
- Receiving touchdowns: 1
- Stats at Pro Football Reference
- College Football Hall of Fame

Charles Raymond White (January 22, 1958 – January 11, 2023) was an American professional football running back who played in the National Football League (NFL) for nine seasons from 1980 to 1988. He played college football for the USC Trojans, where he was a twice unanimous All-American and the winner of the Heisman Trophy. He was selected by the Cleveland Browns in the first round (27th overall) of the 1980 NFL draft. He also played for the Los Angeles Rams.

== Early life ==
Born in Los Angeles, California, White graduated from San Fernando High School in San Fernando, where as a track and field athlete he won the 330-yard (302 m) low hurdles at the CIF California State Meet over future Olympic Gold medalist Andre Phillips. He was also a standout high school football player.

== College career ==
White attended the University of Southern California, where he played for the USC Trojans football team. In 1978, White won the W.J. Voit Memorial Trophy as the outstanding college football player on the Pacific Coast. In 1979, he received the Heisman Trophy, Maxwell Award, Walter Camp Award, and was named UPI Player of the Year. He is the second player in Rose Bowl history (of four, total) to have been honored as Player of the Game twice (1979 and 1980).

== Professional career ==
White was the 27th overall pick in the 1980 NFL draft, selected in the first round by the Cleveland Browns. After four disappointing seasons in Cleveland, where he rushed for a total of 942 yards and had a 3.4 yards per carry average, White was released before the start of the 1985 season. White later acknowledged that he struggled with cocaine addiction during this period.

After his release from the Browns in 1985, he reunited with his college coach, John Robinson, who was then coaching the Los Angeles Rams. White played for the Rams for four seasons, 1985 to 1988. In 1987, he rushed for a league-leading 1,387 yards and 11 touchdowns, which earned him a Pro Bowl selection and the NFL Comeback Player of the Year Award.

White finished his NFL career with 3,075 rushing yards, and 23 rushing touchdowns, along with 114 receptions, 860 yards, and one receiving touchdown.

== Career statistics ==
=== NFL ===
Legend
	Led the league
**Bold**	Career high

Year	Team	Games		Rushing					Receiving				
Year	Team	GP	GS	Att	Yds	Avg	Lng	TD	Rec	Yds	Avg	Lng	TD
1980	CLE	14	7	86	279	3.2	16	5	17	153	9.0	31	**1**
1981	CLE	**16**	8	97	342	3.5	26	1	27	219	8.1	21	0
1982	CLE	9	9	69	259	3.8	18	3	**34**	**283**	8.3	**36**	0
1984	CLE	10	1	24	62	2.6	8	0	5	29	5.8	17	0
1985	RAM	**16**	0	70	310	4.4	32	3	1	12	**12.0**	12	0
1986	RAM	**16**	0	22	126	**5.7**	19	0	1	7	7.0	7	0
1987	RAM	15	**12**	**324**	**1,374**	4.2	**58**	**11**	23	121	5.3	20	0
1988	RAM	12	3	88	323	3.7	13	0	6	36	6.0	18	0
		108	40	780	3,075	3.9	58	23	114	860	7.5	36	1

=== College ===
Legend
	Led the Pac-8/Pac-10
	Pac-8/Pac-10 record
	Led the NCAA
	NCAA record
**Bold**	Career high

College rushing & receiving statistics*
Season	Team	GP	Att	Yds	Avg	TD	Rec	Yds	Avg	TD
Team			Rushing				Receiving			
1976	USC	12	156	858	5.5	10	6	65	10.8	1
1977	USC	12	285	1,478	5.2	7	9	138	**15.3**	**2**
1978	USC	**13**	**374**	1,859	5.0	13	**22**	**193**	8.8	1
1979	USC	12	332	**2,050**	**6.2**	**19**	**22**	145	6.6	0
Career		49	1,147	6,245	5.4	49	59	541	9.2	4

* Includes bowl games.

== Awards and honors ==
NFL

- NFL Comeback Player of the Year (1987)
- First-team All-Pro (1987)
- Pro Bowl (1987)
- NFL rushing yards leader (1987)
- NFL rushing touchdowns co-leader (1987)

College

- National champion (1978)
- Heisman Trophy (1979)
- Maxwell Award (1979)
- Chic Harley Award (1979)
- Walter Camp Award (1979)
- UPI Player of the Year (1979)
- SN Player of the Year (1979)
- 2× Unanimous All-American (1978, 1979)
- 2× Pac-10 Player of the Year (1978, 1979)
- Pop Warner Trophy (1979)
- 3× First-team All-Pac-10 (1977–1979)
- USC Trojans No. 12 retired

== Post-playing career ==
In 1993, White joined USC as running backs coach; he later worked as a computer consultant.

In its third and fourth seasons, American Gladiators held special "Pro Football Challenge of Champions" shows. White participated in and won both, each time coming from behind in the "Eliminator" thanks to slip-ups by his opponents. He also competed in its sixth season's USC vs. Notre Dame alumni special where he also won, giving him a 3-0 record on the show.

== Personal life and drug use ==
During his years at USC, White struggled with cocaine and marijuana use. In a 1987 Sports Illustrated article, he admitted to smoking marijuana daily at USC and snorted his first line of cocaine a few weeks before the 1977 Rose Bowl. He met fellow USC student Judi McGovern and the two dated throughout their time at USC, eventually marrying and having a daughter. However, White continued his cocaine use through college and on into his early NFL career with the Browns. White checked into drug rehab in 1982 and was clean for three years. Even so, the Browns cut him in 1985 and he was picked up on waivers by the Los Angeles Rams, where he was reunited with John Robinson, his former college coach at USC.

White soon had a short relapse into cocaine, but got clean again until one night in August 1987, where he and a friend did lines until White was arrested. However, Robinson bailed him out of jail and agreed to keep him on the team if he stayed clean. White responded with the best season of his career in the strike-affected 1987 season, running for 339 yards in the three "scab games" after the Rams traded Eric Dickerson —- and then running for 100 yards in five straight games afterwards.

White and McGovern eventually divorced. White sold his 1979 Heisman Trophy in 2000 to settle tax debts. White had five children, three daughters and two sons.

A Los Angeles Times article on July 17, 2022, by Bill Plaschke describes White's struggles with dementia and how he was living in an Orange County, California assisted living facility as of 2022. White could still recall his football days, but had issues with day-to-day functioning; the signs were that his dementia was caused by his career playing football.

White died of liver cancer on January 11, 2023, at the age of 64. He is one of at least 345 NFL players to be diagnosed after death with chronic traumatic encephalopathy (CTE), which is caused by repeated hits to the head.

== See also ==
- List of college football yearly rushing leaders
- List of NFL players with chronic traumatic encephalopathy
