= 1977 Astro-Bluebonnet Bowl =

USC Trojans	Texas A&M Aggies
(7–4)	(8–3)
47	28
Head coach: John Robinson	Head coach: Emory Bellard
AP / Coaches; 20 / 20	AP / Coaches; 18 / 18
	1	2	3	4	Total
USC	7	13	14	13	47
Texas A&M	14	0	0	14	28
- Date: December 31, 1977
- Season: 1977
- Stadium: Astrodome
- Location: Houston, Texas
- Attendance: 52,842

United States TV coverage
- Network: Mizlou Television Network
- Announcers: Jim Karvellas, Walt Garrison and Don Tollefson

The 1977 Astro-Bluebonnet Bowl was an American college football bowl game played on December 31, 1977, at the Astrodome in Houston, Texas. The game pitted the Texas A&M Aggies and the USC Trojans.

== Background ==
The Trojans started the season ranked #4, and they won their first four games to rise to #1 in the polls before a matchup with #7 Alabama at home. A 21–20 loss dropped them to #6, and they responded with a win over Oregon. But losses to #11 Notre Dame and California dropped them to #16. A win over Stanford was soon followed with a loss to Washington that dropped them out of the rankings, though they did beat #17 UCLA to finish the season strong, albeit tied for 2nd with Stanford in the Pacific-8 Conference. This was their seventh bowl game of the decade. As for Texas A&M, they started the season ranked at #9, and they responded with three victories to rise to #5 in the polls heading into a matchup with #3 Michigan in Ann Arbor. A 41–3 loss dropped them to #13, though they did win their next three games to get to #11 before a game with #8 Arkansas. A 26–20 loss dropped them to #14, though they did beat TCU the next week. A 57–28 loss to #1 Texas killed their hopes for a conference title, though they finished with a 27–7 win over Houston, with a third-place finish in the Southwest Conference. This was their third bowl game in three years, and second in the calendar year of 1977.

== Game summary ==
- Texas A&M - Woodard 3-yard touchdown run (Franklin kick)
- Texas A&M - Mosley 44-yard touchdown run (Franklin kick)
- USC - Sweeney 29-yard touchdown pass from Hertel (Jordan kick)
- USC - White 25-yard touchdown pass from Hertel (Jordan kick)
- USC - Jordan 22-yard field goal
- USC - Jordan 29-yard field goal
- USC - Sweeney 40-yard touchdown pass from Hertel (Burns pass from Hertel)
- USC - Simmrin 14-yard touchdown pass from Hertel (kick failed)
- Texas A&M - Woodard 1-yard touchdown run (Franklin kick)
- USC - Ford 94-yard touchdown run (run failed)
- USC - Tatupu 8-yard touchdown run (Jordan kick)
- Texas A&M - Armstrong 4-yard touchdown run (Franklin kick)

Rob Hertel threw for four touchdown passes for the Trojans, while Charles White and Dwight Ford both had 100 yards rushing. The Aggies turned it over five times.

== Aftermath ==
This was the only Bluebonnet Bowl appearance for either team. USC went to two more bowl games in the decade, while Texas A&M went to one more.
