= Jerry Robinson (linebacker) =

American football player (born 1956)

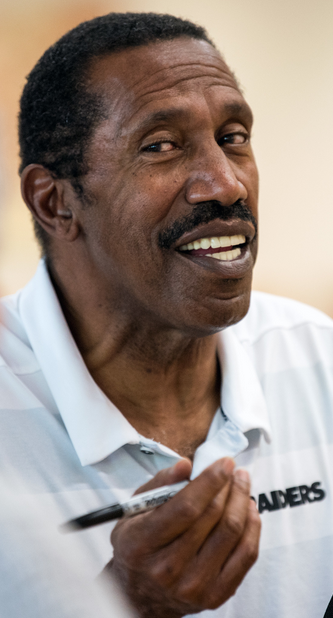
- Robinson in 2018

No. 56, 57
- Position: Linebacker

Personal information
- Born: December 18, 1956 (age 69); San Francisco, California, U.S.
- Listed height: 6 ft 2 in (1.88 m)
- Listed weight: 218 lb (99 kg)

Career information
- High school: Cardinal Newman (Santa Rosa, California)
- College: UCLA (1975–1978)
- NFL draft: 1979: 1st round, 21st overall pick

Career history
- Philadelphia Eagles (1979–1984); Los Angeles Raiders (1985–1991)

Awards and highlights
- First-team All-Pro (1981); 2× Second-team All-Pro (1980, 1981); Pro Bowl (1981); PFWA All-Rookie Team (1979); 2× Unanimous All-American (1977, 1978); Consensus All-American (1976); Pop Warner Trophy (1978); 3× First-team All-Pac-10 (1976, 1977, 1978); Second-team AP All-Time All-American (2025); UCLA Bruins No. 84 retired

Career NFL statistics
- Sacks: 19.5
- Interceptions: 12
- Touchdowns: 2
- Stats at Pro Football Reference
- College Football Hall of Fame

Jerry Dewayne Robinson (born December 18, 1956) is an American former professional football player who was a linebacker for 13 seasons in the National Football League (NFL) during the 1970s, 1980s and 1990s. He played college football for the UCLA Bruins, earning All-American honors. Chosen in the first round of the 1979 NFL draft, he played professionally for the Philadelphia Eagles and Los Angeles Raiders of the NFL.

== Early life ==
Robinson was born in San Francisco, California. He attended Cardinal Newman High School in Santa Rosa, California, where he played for the Cardinal Newman high school football team.

== College career ==
Robinson attended the University of California, Los Angeles (UCLA), where he played for the Bruins from 1975 to 1978. He was recruited as a tight end by Dick Vermeil, his future professional coach, who along with Jed Hughes converted him to linebacker. He was a three-time consensus first-team All-American (1976, 1977, 1978). Robinson was inducted into the College Football Hall of Fame in 1996. In 1999, Sports Illustrated included him on its All-Century Team for college football.

== Professional career ==
The Philadelphia Eagles selected Robinson in the first round (21st pick overall) in the 1979 NFL Draft, and he played for the Eagles from 1979 to 1984. He was a member of the Eagles for Super Bowl XV, and was chosen for the Pro Bowl after the 1981 season. He finished his NFL career with the Los Angeles Raiders from 1985 to 1991. In his thirteen NFL seasons, he played in 184 games, started 147 of them, and compiled twelve interceptions and fifteen fumble recoveries.
