= 1978 Rose Bowl =

American college football game

- 64th Rose Bowl Game
| Washington Huskies | Michigan Wolverines |
| (7–4) | (10–1) |
| Pac-8 | Big Ten |
| 27 | 20 |
| Head coach: Don James | Head coach: Bo Schembechler |
| AP / Coaches; 13 / 14 | AP / Coaches; 4 / 4 |
| | 1 | 2 | 3 | 4 | Total |
|---|---|---|---|---|---|
| Washington | 7 | 10 | 10 | 0 | 27 |
| Michigan | 0 | 0 | 7 | 13 | 20 |
- Date: January 2, 1978
- Season: 1977
- Stadium: Rose Bowl
- Location: Pasadena, California
- Player of the Game: Warren Moon (Washington QB)
- Favorite: Michigan by 14
- Referee: Otho Kortz (Big Ten); (split crew: Big Ten, Pac-10)
- Attendance: 105,312

United States TV coverage
- Network: NBC
- Announcers: Curt Gowdy (play-by-play); John Brodie (color); Charlie Jones (sideline)
- Nielsen ratings: 29.2

The 1978 Rose Bowl was a college football bowl game, played on Monday, January 2, and was the 64th Rose Bowl Game. The Washington Huskies, champions of the Pacific-8 Conference, defeated the favored Michigan Wolverines, champions of the Big Ten Conference, 27–20. Washington quarterback Warren Moon was named the Rose Bowl Player of the Game.

The Huskies led 17–0 at the half and extended it to 24–0 early in the third quarter, then held off a Wolverine comeback with two interceptions deep in their own territory in the last two minutes to win by seven. It was the second of three consecutive losses in the Rose Bowl for Michigan, a two-touchdown favorite entering this game.

The face value of game tickets was $17.50 each.

== Teams ==
=== Michigan Wolverines ===
Led by junior quarterback Rick Leach, Michigan began the season ranked second, and were first after four of the first six weeks. However, a stunning 16–0 loss on October 22 at Minnesota dropped them to sixth. A 14–6 win over fourth-ranked rival Ohio State gave the Wolverines the Big Ten title and they came into the Rose Bowl ranked fourth.

=== Washington Huskies ===
In their third season under head coach Don James and quarterback Warren Moon, Washington stumbled out of the gate, losing three of their first four games, all out of conference. They then won six of seven, losing 20–12 at UCLA on October 29 (later vacated by the Bruins, due to ineligible players). The Huskies won the Pac-8 title and earned the Rose Bowl berth when UCLA lost its final game on a last second field goal to USC, 29–27. Washington entered the game ranked thirteenth in the AP poll, and tied for fourteenth in the UPI coaches poll.

== Scoring ==
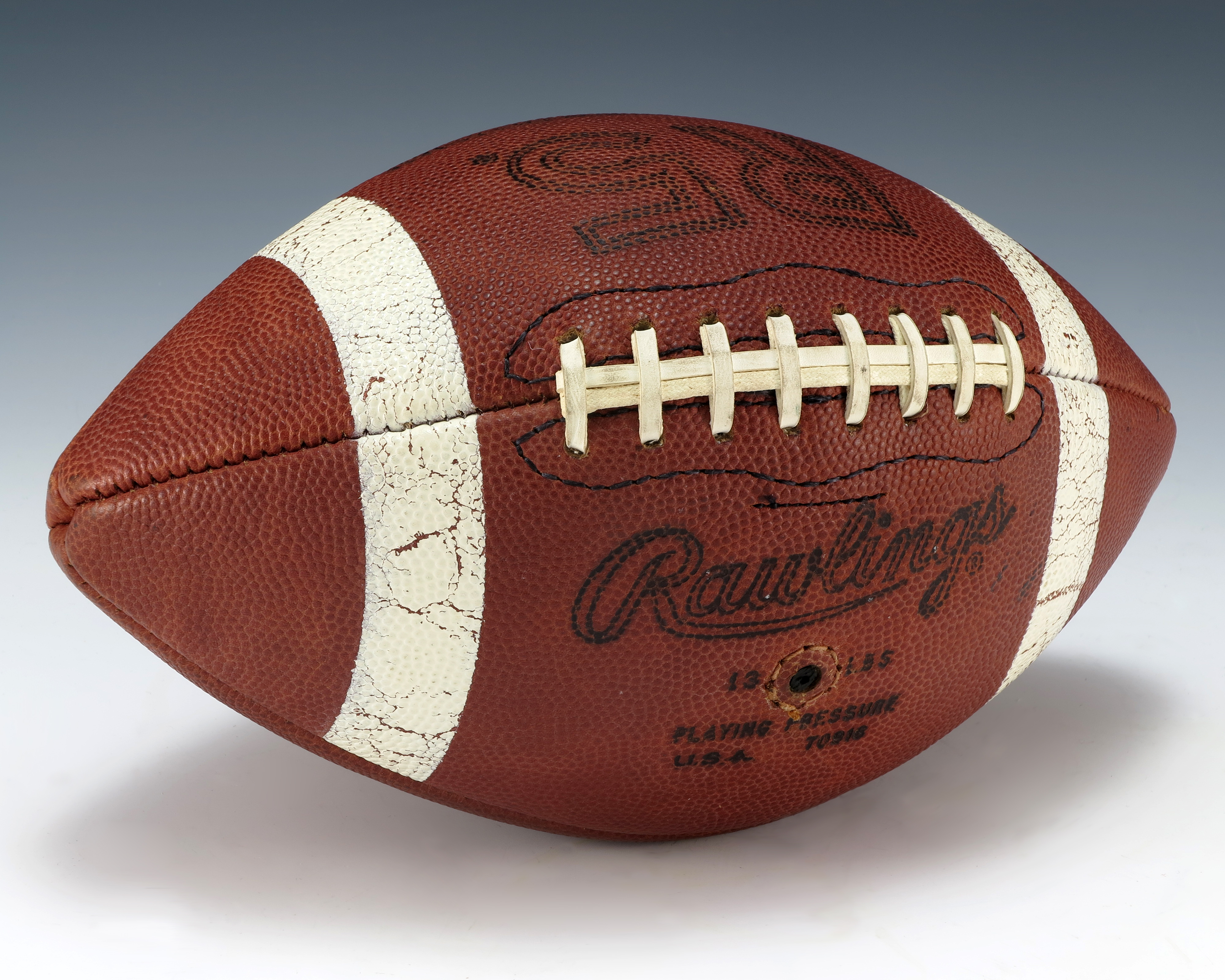
A game ball from the 1978 Rose Bowl

=== First quarter ===
- Washington – Warren Moon 2-yard run (Steve Robbins kick); UW 7–0

=== Second quarter ===
- Washington – Robbins 30-yard field goal; UW 10–0
- Washington – Moon 1-yard run (Robbins kick); UW 17–0

=== Third quarter ===
- Washington – Spider Gaines 28-yard pass from Moon (Robbins kick); UW 24–0
- Michigan – Curt Stephenson 76-yard pass from Rick Leach (Gregg Willner kick); UW 24–7
- Washington – Robbins 18-yard field goal; UW 27–7

=== Fourth quarter ===
- Michigan – Russell Davis 2-yard run (Willner kick); UW 27–14
- Michigan – Stan Edwards 32-yard pass from Leach (kick failed); UW 27–20

== Statistics ==
| Statistics | Washington | Michigan |
|---|---|---|
| First downs | 17 | 22 |
| Rushes–yards | 48–164 | 48–149 |
| Passing yards | 234 | 239 |
| Passes | 13–24–2 | 14–27–2 |
| Total yards | 398 | 388 |
| Punts–average | 5–39 | 4–43 |
| Fumbles–lost | 0–0 | 2–1 |
| Turnovers by | 2 | 3 |
| Penalties–yards | 6–47 | 3–11 |

== Aftermath ==
With Notre Dame beating top-ranked and undefeated Texas in the Cotton Bowl, Michigan had hopes that a dominant win over Washington would boost the Wolverines to the national title. The Huskies' dramatic upset ended those hopes, and Notre Dame was voted first in the polls among five one-loss teams; Alabama, Arkansas, Texas, and Penn State were the others. Michigan dropped to ninth in the final AP poll and Washington climbed to tenth; both were a spot higher in the UPI coaches poll.
