= Jeff Toews =

American football player (born 1957)

No. 60
- Position: Guard

Personal information
- Born: November 4, 1957 (age 69); San Jose, California, U.S.
- Listed height: 6 ft 3 in (1.91 m)
- Listed weight: 255 lb (116 kg)

Career information
- High school: Del Mar (San Jose)
- College: Washington
- NFL draft: 1979: 2nd round, 53rd overall pick

Career history
- Miami Dolphins (1979–1985)

Awards and highlights
- Second-team All-American (1978); 2× First-team All-Pac-10 (1977, 1978)

Career NFL statistics
- Games played: 71
- Games started: 14
- Fumble recoveries: 1
- Stats at Pro Football Reference

Jeffrey Mark Toews (born November 4, 1957) is an American former professional football player who was an offensive tackle and guard for seven seasons with the Miami Dolphins of the National Football League (NFL). He played college football for the Washington Huskies and was named to the 1977 All-Pacific-8 Conference football team, 1978 All-Pacific-10 Conference football team, and 1978 College Football All-America Team. He was selected by the Dolphins in the second round of the 1979 NFL draft.

== Personal life ==
He is the younger brother of former Pittsburgh Steelers linebacker Loren Toews.
