= Frank Corral =

Mexican-American football player (born 1955)

No. 3
- Positions: Kicker, Punter

Personal information
- Born: June 16, 1955 (age 71); Delicias, Chihuahua, Mexico
- Listed height: 6 ft 2 in (1.88 m)
- Listed weight: 224 lb (102 kg)

Career information
- High school: Norte Vista (Riverside, California, U.S.)
- College: UCLA
- NFL draft: 1978: 3rd round, 78th overall pick

Career history
- Los Angeles Rams (1978–1981); Chicago Blitz (1983); Arizona Wranglers (1984); Houston Gamblers (1985)

Awards and highlights
- Second-team All-Pro (1978); Pro Bowl (1978); NFL scoring leader (1978); PFWA All-Rookie Team (1978); PFW Golden Toe Award (1978); First-team All-Pac-8 (1976); Second-team All-Pac-8 (1977)

Career NFL statistics
- Field goals: 75
- Field goal attempts: 124
- Field goal %: 60.5
- Longest field goal: 49
- Punts: 165
- Punting yards: 6,737
- Average punt: 40.8
- Stats at Pro Football Reference

Juan Francisco Corrales Rodríguez (born June 16, 1955), better known as Frank Corral, is a Mexican-American former professional football player who was a placekicker and punter in the National Football League (NFL) and United States Football League (USFL). He played college football for the UCLA Bruins. Selected by the Los Angeles Rams in the third round of the 1978 NFL draft, he was a part of their Super Bowl XIV team. He later played in the USFL with the Chicago Blitz, the Arizona Wranglers and the Houston Gamblers.

== Early life ==
Corral was born on June 16, 1955, in Delicias, Chihuahua. His father, Alfonso Corrales Ruiz, hailed from Ciudad Jiménez while his mother, Soledad Rodríguez Natividad, was from Camargo. The family moved to Ciudad Juárez before immigrating to the United States, where they lived in Colorado before settling in California.

Corral was a six-sport athlete at Norte Vista High School in Riverside, California, playing football along with baseball, basketball, tennis, soccer, and track and field. He earned a football scholarship to UCLA.

== Career ==
Drafted in the third round of the 1978 NFL draft, Corral won the placekicking duties for the Los Angeles Rams in his rookie season. He added punting chores to his list of duties in 1980 and 1981 and remains the last NFL player to have been both the starting placekicker and punter for his team. In 1982, he was replaced by John Misko (punting) and Mike Lansford (placekicking). He would not return to the NFL.

In 1983 Corral moved to the USFL. While playing for the Chicago Blitz, Corral connected on 37 of 40 extra point attempts and 22 of 41 field goals for 105 points. He also was the punter for Chicago, punting 74 times for 2989 yards and 40.4 average. The next year, for the Arizona Wranglers, Corral was 63 of 65 on PATs and 11 of 21 in field goals for 96 points. He also punted 69 times for 2856 yards and a 41.4 average.

In 1985 for the Houston Gamblers, Corral punted 24 times for 961 yards and a 40.0-yard average and handled the kickoff duties. Toni Fritsch handled the placekicking duties for the Gamblers.
