= Randy Simmrin =

American football player (born 1956)

No. 73
- Position: Wide receiver

Personal information
- Born: November 5, 1956 (age 70); Los Angeles, California, U.S.
- Listed height: 6 ft 0 in (1.83 m)
- Listed weight: 170 lb (77 kg)

Career information
- High school: John Burroughs (Burbank, California)
- College: USC (1974–1977)
- NFL draft: 1978: undrafted

Career history
- Buffalo Bills (1978)*; Miami Dolphins (1979)*; Tampa Bay Buccaneers (1980)*; Edmonton Eskimos (1980–1981)
- * Offseason or practice squad member only

Awards and highlights
- Grey Cup champion (1980); National champion (1974); Second-team All Pac-8 (1977)

Career CFL statistics
- Games played: 1
- Receptions: 2
- Receiving yards: 29

Randall D. Simmrin (born November 5, 1956) is an American former professional football wide receiver who played in the Canadian Football League (CFL) with the Edmonton Eskimos. He played college football for the USC Trojans.

== Early life ==
Simmrin was born on November 5, 1956, in Los Angeles, California. He attended John Burroughs High School in Burbank, California. Simmrin also competed in basketball and track.

== College career ==
Simmrin played college football for the USC Trojans from 1974 to 1977. He was a three-year letterman from 1975 to 1977. In 44 games, Simmrin had 91 receptions for 1,818 yards and ten touchdowns. In his senior year, he was named to the second-team All-Pac-8.

== Professional career ==
After going undrafted in the 1978 NFL draft, Simmrin signed with the Buffalo Bills as an undrafted free agent. On August 24, he was released by the team.

On May 11, 1979, Simmrin was signed by the Miami Dolphins. On August 20, he was waived by the team. On April 20, 1980, the Tampa Bay Buccaneers signed Simmrin. He was released by the team on August 25.

On October 8, 1980, Simmrin had a workout with the Edmonton Eskimos of the Canadian Football League (CFL) and made the practice roster. He played in one game and had two receptions for 29 yards. On June 20, 1981, Simmrin was released by the team.
