= 1977 California Golden Bears football team =

American college football season

1977 California Golden Bears football
- Conference: Pacific-8 Conference
- Record: 8–3 (4–3 Pac-8)
- Head coach: Mike White (6th season)
- Home stadium: California Memorial Stadium

1977 Pacific-8 Conference football standings
	Conf.					Overall
Team	W		L		T	W		L		T
No. 10 Washington $	6	–	1	–	0	8	–	4	–	0
No. 15 Stanford	5	–	2	–	0	9	–	3	–	0
No. 13 USC	5	–	2	–	0	8	–	4	–	0
California	3	–	4	–	0	7	–	4	–	0
Washington State	3	–	4	–	0	6	–	5	–	0
Oregon	1	–	6	–	0	2	–	9	–	0
Oregon State	0	–	7	–	0	2	–	9	–	0
UCLA †	0	–	2	–	0	0	–	4	–	0
$ – Conference champion; † – UCLA forfeited 7 wins (5 conference wins) due to ineligible players.; Rankings from AP Poll

The 1977 California Golden Bears football team was an American football team that represented the University of California, Berkeley during the 1977 NCAA Division I football season. Under head coach Mike White, the team compiled an overall record of 8–3 and 4–3 in conference. This was coach Whites's last season.

Cal claims a loss to UCLA as a victory, due to UCLA's subsequent forfeiture of 1977 games involving ineligible players.

== Schedule ==
Date	Opponent	Rank	Site	Result	Attendance	Source
September 10	at Tennessee*		Neyland Stadium; Knoxville, TN	W 27–17	84,421	
September 17	Air Force*		California Memorial Stadium; Berkeley, CA	W 24–14	35,165	
September 24	at Missouri*		Faurot Field; Columbia, MO	W 28–21	56,735	
October 1	San Jose State*	No. 17	California Memorial Stadium; Berkeley, CA	W 52–3	35,275	
October 8	at Washington State	No. 14	Martin Stadium; Pullman, WA	L 10–17	27,500	
October 15	Oregon State	No. 20	California Memorial Stadium; Berkeley, CA	W 41–17	33,400	
October 22	at UCLA	No. 15	Los Angeles Memorial Coliseum; Los Angeles, CA (rivalry)	W 19–21 (UCLA forfeit)	48,584	
October 29	No. 10 USC		California Memorial Stadium; Berkeley, CA	W 17–14	76,780	
November 5	Washington	No. 17	California Memorial Stadium; Berkeley, CA	L 31–50	38,812	
November 12	at Oregon		Autzen Stadium; Eugene, OR	W 48–16	15,000	
November 19	at Stanford		Stanford Stadium; Stanford, CA (Big Game)	L 3–21	87,500	
*Non-conference game; Rankings from AP Poll released prior to the game

== Roster ==
1977 California Golden Bears football team roster
Players
Coaches
Offense

Pos.	#	Name	Class
WR	10	Matt Bouza	So
QB	19	Rich Campbell	Fr
TE		George Freitas
QB		Gary Graumann
		Oliver Hillmom
FB		Paul Jones
WR		Jesse Thompson
QB		Charlie Young

Defense

Pos.	#	Name	Class
DE	94	Ralph DeLoach	Jr
DB		Ken McAllister
LB		Burl Toler

Special teams

Pos.	#	Name	Class
K	3	Jim Breech	Sr

Head coach

- Mike White

Coordinators/assistant coaches

Legend

- (C) Team captain
- (S) Suspended
- (I) Ineligible
- Injured
- Redshirt
