= Ricky Odom =

American football player (born 1956)

No. 38, 42, 23
- Position: Cornerback

Personal information
- Born: September 16, 1956 (age 70); Jonesboro, Louisiana, U.S.
- Listed height: 6 ft 0 in (1.83 m)
- Listed weight: 183 lb (83 kg)

Career information
- High school: Los Angeles
- College: USC
- NFL draft: 1978: 7th round, 168th overall pick

Career history
- Kansas City Chiefs (1978); San Francisco 49ers (1978); Washington Redskins (1979)*; Los Angeles Rams (1979)
- * Offseason or practice squad member only

Awards and highlights
- First-team All-Pac-8 (1977); Second-team All-Pac-8 (1976)
- Stats at Pro Football Reference

Ricky L. Odom (born September 16, 1956) is an American former professional football cornerback who played in the National Football League (NFL) with the Kansas City Chiefs, San Francisco 49ers, and Los Angeles Rams. He played college football for the USC Trojans and was selected by the Chiefs in the seventh round of the 1978 NFL draft.

== Early life ==
Ricky L. Odom was born on September 16, 1956, in Jonesboro, Louisiana. He attended Los Angeles High School in Los Angeles, California.

== College career ==
Odom enrolled at the University of Southern California to play college football for the Trojans. He was on the varsity team in 1974 and 1975 but did not earn a letter either year. He was a two-year varsity letterman at cornerback from 1976 to 1977, recording five interceptions each season. Odom earned Coaches second-team All-Pacific-8 Conference honors in 1976. He was arrested for marijuana possession in May 1977. He garnered Coaches first-team All-Pac-8 recognition as a senior in 1977. At the conclusion of his college career, Odom was invited to the 1978 Hula Bowl. He was named the game's defensive MVP after intercepting three passes.

== Professional career ==
Odom was selected by the Kansas City Chiefs in the seventh round, with the 168th overall pick, of the 1978 NFL draft. He signed with the team on May 29. He played in the first eight games for the Chiefs in 1978 as a reserve cornerback before being released on October 25, 1978. A Chiefs sportswriter said Odom "made a lot of mistakes. He jumped offsides on punt coverage, had a pass interference in the end zone. He seemed overeager."

Odom signed with the San Francisco 49ers on November 24, 1978. He started the final three games of the 1978 season for the 49ers in place of Vern Roberson, posting one forced fumble and two interceptions for 19 yards. On July 27, 1979, it was reported that Odom had been waived by the 49ers, giving the first-string cornerback job to Melvin Morgan. 49ers defensive backs coach Norb Hecker said Odom had not made any improvements, even during the spring minicamp.

Odom was claimed off waivers by the Washington Redskins. He was released on August 9, 1979, after the first game of the 1979 preseason.

On October 31, 1979, Odom signed with the Los Angeles Rams after injuries in the team's secondary. He played in one game for the Rams in a backup role before being released on November 7. He was re-signed by the Rams the next day after Ken Ellis injured his groin. Odom played in two more games that year.
