= 1977 Stanford Cardinals football team =

American college football season

1977 Stanford Cardinals football

Sun Bowl champion

Sun Bowl, W 24–14 vs. LSU
- Conference: Pacific-8 Conference

Ranking
- Coaches: No. 15
- AP: No. 15
- Record: 9–3 (5–2 Pac-8)
- Head coach: Bill Walsh (1st season)
- Offensive scheme: West Coast
- Home stadium: Stanford Stadium

1977 Pacific-8 Conference football standings
	Conf.					Overall
Team	W		L		T	W		L		T
No. 10 Washington $	6	–	1	–	0	8	–	4	–	0
No. 15 Stanford	5	–	2	–	0	9	–	3	–	0
No. 13 USC	5	–	2	–	0	8	–	4	–	0
California	3	–	4	–	0	7	–	4	–	0
Washington State	3	–	4	–	0	6	–	5	–	0
Oregon	1	–	6	–	0	2	–	9	–	0
Oregon State	0	–	7	–	0	2	–	9	–	0
UCLA †	0	–	2	–	0	0	–	4	–	0
$ – Conference champion; † – UCLA forfeited 7 wins (5 conference wins) due to ineligible players.; Rankings from AP Poll

The 1977 Stanford Cardinals football team represented Stanford University in the Pacific-8 Conference during the 1977 NCAA Division I football season. Led by first-year head coach Bill Walsh, Stanford ended the regular season with an 8–3 record (5–2 in Pac-8, tie for second).

The Cardinals were led by senior quarterback Guy Benjamin, who won the Sammy Baugh Trophy, awarded to the best passer in college football; senior receiver James Lofton, who caught 57 passes for 1,010 yards and 14 TDs and was named an AP and NEA Second Team All-American; junior linebacker Gordy Ceresino, and freshman running back Darrin Nelson.

On New Year's Eve, Stanford defeated LSU 24–14 in the Sun Bowl for their ninth win. and climbed to fifteenth in the final rankings.

Walsh, previously the offensive coordinator of the NFL's San Diego Chargers, was hired the previous December. He had been an assistant at Stanford under John Ralston from 1963 through 1965 and spent eight seasons as an assistant with the expansion Cincinnati Bengals under head coach Paul Brown.

== Schedule ==
Date	Opponent	Site	TV	Result	Attendance	Source
September 10	at No. 12 Colorado*	Folsom Field; Boulder, CO		L 21–27	50,482	
September 17	at Tulane*	Louisiana Superdome; New Orleans, LA		W 21–17	30,482	
September 24	Illinois*	Stanford Stadium; Stanford, CA		W 37–24	50,500	
October 1	Oregon	Stanford Stadium; Stanford, CA		W 20–10	36,500	
October 8	UCLA	Stanford Stadium; Stanford, CA		W 32–28	64,500	
October 15	at Washington	Husky Stadium; Seattle, WA		L 21–45	46,529	
October 22	Washington State	Stanford Stadium; Stanford, CA		W 31–29	47,500	
October 29	at Oregon State	Parker Stadium; Corvallis, OR		W 26–7	20,196	
November 5	at No. 16 USC	Los Angeles Memorial Coliseum; Los Angeles, CA (rivalry)		L 0–49	65,101	
November 12	San Jose State*	Stanford Stadium; Stanford, CA (rivalry)		W 31–26	39,000	
November 19	California	Stanford Stadium; Stanford, CA (Big Game)		W 21–3	87,500	
December 31	LSU*	Sun Bowl; El Paso, TX (Sun Bowl)	CBS	W 24–14	31,318	
*Non-conference game; Rankings from AP Poll released prior to the game

== Roster ==
1977 Stanford Cardinal football team roster
Players
Coaches
Offense

Pos.	#	Name	Class
QB	7	Guy Benjamin	Sr
WR	30	James Lofton	Sr
RB	31	Darrin Nelson	Fr
OT	72	Gordon King	Sr

Defense

Pos.	#	Name	Class
LB	95	Gordy Ceresino	Jr

Special teams

Pos.	#	Name	Class

Head coach

- Bill Walsh (1st year)

Coordinators/assistant coaches

- Denny Green – Running backs
- Rod Dowhower – Wide receivers
- Tom Lovat – Offensive line
- Doug Single – Offensive line
- Fred von Appen – Defensive line
- Russell Charles – Linebackers
- Norb Hecker – Linebackers
- George Seifert – Defensive backs

Legend

- (C) Team captain
- (S) Suspended
- (I) Ineligible
- Injured
- Redshirt

== Awards and honors ==
- Guy Benjamin, Sammy Baugh Trophy
- James Lofton, AP and NEA Second Team All-American selection

== NFL draft ==
Four Cardinals were selected in the 1978 NFL draft.

Player	Position	Round	Overall	Franchise
James Lofton	WR	1	6	Green Bay Packers
Gordon King	T	1	10	New York Giants
Guy Benjamin	QB	2	51	Miami Dolphins
Bill Kellar	WR	7	184	Kansas City Chiefs
