= 1977 Washington Huskies football team =

American college football season

1977 Washington Huskies football

Pacific-8 champion Rose Bowl champion

Rose Bowl, W 27–20 vs. Michigan
- Conference: Pacific-8 Conference

Ranking
- Coaches: No. 9
- AP: No. 10
- Record: 10–2 (7–0 Pac-8)
- Head coach: Don James (3rd season)
- Offensive coordinator: Dick Scesniak (3rd season)
- Defensive coordinator: Jim E. Mora (3rd season)
- MVP: Warren Moon
- Captains: Blair Bush; Dave Browning; Warren Moon; Mike Rohrbach
- Home stadium: Husky Stadium

1977 Pacific-8 Conference football standings
	Conf.					Overall
Team	W		L		T	W		L		T
No. 10 Washington $	6	–	1	–	0	8	–	4	–	0
No. 15 Stanford	5	–	2	–	0	9	–	3	–	0
No. 13 USC	5	–	2	–	0	8	–	4	–	0
California	3	–	4	–	0	7	–	4	–	0
Washington State	3	–	4	–	0	6	–	5	–	0
Oregon	1	–	6	–	0	2	–	9	–	0
Oregon State	0	–	7	–	0	2	–	9	–	0
UCLA †	0	–	2	–	0	0	–	4	–	0
$ – Conference champion; † – UCLA forfeited 7 wins (5 conference wins) due to ineligible players.; Rankings from AP Poll

The 1977 Washington Huskies football team represented the University of Washington in the 1977 NCAA Division I football season as a member of the Pacific-8 Conference (Pac-8). The Huskies were led by third-year head coach Don James and played their home games at Husky Stadium in Seattle. They finished the regular season at 8–3 overall, were champions of the Pac-8 at 7–0, and earned a trip to the Rose Bowl on January 2.

The Huskies were 14-point underdogs to No. 4 Michigan, but upset the Wolverines 27–20.

== Schedule ==
Date	Opponent	Rank	Site	Result	Attendance	Source
September 10	No. 16 Mississippi State*		Husky Stadium; Seattle, WA	W 18–27† (Miss. State forfeit)	45,050	
September 17	San Jose State*		Husky Stadium; Seattle, WA	W 24–3	36,489	
September 24	at Syracuse*		Archbold Stadium; Syracuse, NY	L 20–22	12,839	
October 1	at Minnesota*		Memorial Stadium; Minneapolis, MN	L 17–19	31,895	
October 8	at Oregon		Autzen Stadium; Eugene, OR (rivalry)	W 54–0	29,500	
October 15	Stanford		Husky Stadium; Seattle, WA	W 45–21	46,529	
October 22	Oregon State		Husky Stadium; Seattle, WA	W 14–6	46,677	
October 29	at UCLA		Los Angeles Memorial Coliseum; Los Angeles, CA	W 12–20† (UCLA forfeit)	38,692	
November 5	at California		California Memorial Stadium; Berkeley, CA	W 50–31	38,812	
November 12	No. 14 USC		Husky Stadium; Seattle, WA	W 28–10	59,501	
November 19	Washington State	No. 19	Husky Stadium; Seattle, WA (Apple Cup)	W 35–15	60,964	
January 2, 1978	vs. No. 4 Michigan*	No. 13	Rose Bowl; Pasadena, CA (Rose Bowl)	W 27–20	105,312	
*Non-conference game; Rankings from AP Poll released prior to the game

† Games were subsequently vacated or forfeited to Washington

== Roster ==
1977 Washington Huskies football team roster
Players
Coaches
Offense

Pos.	#	Name	Class
FL	81	Gary Briggs	So
C	58	Blair Bush (C)	Sr
G	72	Marshall Cromer	Jr
G	75	Mike Curtis	So
QB	12	Tom Flick	So
FB	42	Ron Gipson	So
TE	86	Scott Greenwood	Jr
OT	78	Curt Marsh	Fr
QB	1	Warren Moon (C)	Sr
RB	24	Joe Steele	So
OT	63	Jeff Toews	Jr
C	56	Tom Turnure	So
RB	45	Toussaint Tyler	Fr
OT	79	Randy Van Divier	Fr
OT	70	Robert Westlund	Jr

Defense

Pos.	#	Name	Class
MG	67	Cliff Bethea	Sr
DT	65	Dave Browning (C)	Sr
SS	39	John Edwards	Jr
CB	23	Nesby Glasgow	Jr
LB	55	Bruce Harrell	So
FS	96	Kyle Heinrich	Jr
LB	5	Michael Jackson	Jr
LB	34	John Kerley	Jr
CB	19	Mark Lee	So
DT	61	Chris Linnin	So
DE	73	Doug Martin	So
CB	25	Wayne Moses	Sr
LB	48	Antowaine Richardson	So
LB	54	Mike Rohrbach (C)	Sr

Special teams

Pos.	#	Name	Class
K	7	Steve Robbins	Sr
P	27	Aaron Wilson	Jr

Head coach

- Don James (3rd year)

Coordinators/assistant coaches

- Dick Scesniak (OC)
- Jim Mora (DC)
- Jim Lambright (LB)

Legend

- (C) Team captain
- (S) Suspended
- (I) Ineligible
- Injured
- Redshirt

== Game summaries ==
=== At California ===
Washington Huskies at California Golden Bears

Quarter	1	2	3	4	Total
Washington	3	14	21	12	50
California	7	14	0	10	31

at Memorial Stadium • Berkeley, California

- Date: November 5
- Game attendance: 38,812

Game information

Washington

- Warren Moon
  11/19, 207 yds, int
- Joe Steele
  22 rush, 90 yds, 2 TD
- Scott Greenwood
  5 rec, 112 yds

California

- Gary Graumann
  16/31, 172 yds, 2 TD
- Paul Jones
  14 rush, 58 yds
- George Freitas
  9 rec, 139 yds

Scoring summary

Quarter	Time	Drive			Team	Scoring information	Score	
Quarter	Time	Plays	Yards	TOP	Team	Scoring information	WASH	CAL
1					California	Hillmon 7-yard touchdown reception from Young, Breech kick good	0	7
1					Washington	31-yard field goal by Robbins	3	7
2					Washington	Steele 5-yard touchdown run, Robbins kick good	10	7
2					California	Thompson 14-yard touchdown reception from Graumann, Breech kick good	10	14
2					Washington	Tyler 4-yard touchdown run, Robbins kick good	17	14
2					California	Thompson 10-yard touchdown reception from Young, Breech kick good	17	21
3					Washington	Moon 12-yard touchdown run, Robbins kick good	24	21
3					Washington	Moon 1-yard touchdown run, Robbins kick good	31	21
3					Washington	Steele 1-yard touchdown run, Robbins kick good	38	21
4					California	48-yard field goal by Breech		
4					Washington	Safety, center snap out of end zone		
4					Washington	Smith 3-yard touchdown run, Robbins kick good		
4					California	Freitas 7-yard touchdown reception from Graumann, 2-point run/pass good/failed/incomplete		
"TOP" = time of possession. For other American football terms, see Glossary of American football.							50	31

=== USC ===
Team	1	2	3	4	Total
USC	0	3	0	7	10
• Washington	0	7	14	7	28

- Date: November 12
- Location: Husky Stadium, Seattle, WA
- Game attendance: 59,501
- Game weather: Overcast

Scoring summary
2	WASH	Moon 2-yard run (Robbins kick)	WASH 7-0
2	USC	Jordan 26-yard field goal	WASH 7-3
3	WASH	Gaines 19-yard pass from Moon (Robbins kick)	WASH 14-3
3	WASH	Steele 1-yard run (Robbins kick)	WASH 21-3
4	USC	White 1-yard run (Jordan kick)	WASH 21-10
4	WASH	Moon 71-yard run (Robbins kick)	WASH 28-10

=== Washington State ===
Team	1	2	3	4	Total
Washington State	0	0	0	15	15
• Washington	21	7	7	0	35

- Date: November 19
- Location: Husky Stadium, Seattle, WA
- Game attendance: 60,964

Scoring summary
1	WASH	Steele 33-yard pass from Moon (Robbins kick)	WASH 7-0
1	WASH	Greenwood 33-yard pass from Moon (Robbins kick)	WASH 14-0
1	WASH	Steele 3-yard run (Robbins kick)	WASH 21-0
2	WASH	Steele 6-yard pass from Moon (Robbins kick)	WASH 28-0
3	WASH	Rowland 5-yard run (Robbins kick)	WASH 35-0
4	WSU	Doornik 4-yard run (Watson kick)	WASH 35-7
4	WSU	Kelly 14-yard pass from Thompson (Thompson to Ransom pass)	WASH 35-15

== NFL draft selections ==
Two University of Washington Huskies were selected in the 1978 NFL draft, which lasted 12 rounds with 334 selections.

= Husky Hall of Fame

Player	Position	Round	Overall	'Franchise
Blair Bush	Center	1st	16	Cincinnati Bengals
Dave Browning	Defensive end	2nd	54	Oakland Raiders

- Quarterback Warren Moon played for the Edmonton Eskimos (CFL) from 1978 to 1983 and made his NFL debut with the Houston Oilers in 1984.
