= Gordon King (American football) =

American football player (born 1956)

No. 72
- Position: Tackle

Personal information
- Born: February 3, 1956 (age 70); Madison, Wisconsin, U.S.
- Listed height: 6 ft 6 in (1.98 m)
- Listed weight: 275 lb (125 kg)

Career information
- High school: Fair Oaks (CA) Bella Vista
- College: Stanford
- NFL draft: 1978: 1st round, 10th overall pick

Career history
- New York Giants (1978–1985); New York Jets (1986–1987)

Awards and highlights
- Second-team All-American (1977); First-team All-Pac-8 (1977)

Career NFL statistics
- Games played: 97
- Games started: 60
- Fumble recoveries: 3
- Stats at Pro Football Reference

Gordon David King (born February 3, 1956) is an American former professional football player who was an offensive tackle in the National Football League (NFL) for the New York Giants and the New York Jets. He played college football at Stanford University and was selected in the first round (tenth overall) of the 1978 NFL draft.
