= Pat Howell =

American football player (born 1957)

No. 64, 66
- Position: Guard

Personal information
- Born: March 12, 1957 (age 69); Fresno, California, U.S.
- Listed height: 6 ft 5 in (1.96 m)
- Listed weight: 257 lb (117 kg)

Career information
- High school: Fresno
- College: USC
- NFL draft: 1979: 2nd round, 49th overall pick

Career history
- Atlanta Falcons (1979–1983); Houston Oilers (1983–1985)

Awards and highlights
- National champion (1978); Unanimous All-American (1978); 2× First-team All-Pac-10 (1977, 1978)

Career NFL statistics
- Games played: 67
- Games started: 21
- Stats at Pro Football Reference

Patrick Gerrard Howell (born March 12, 1957) is an American former professional football player who was an offensive lineman for seven seasons in the National Football League (NFL) during the late 1970s and 1980s. Howell played college football for the USC Trojans, earning unanimous All-American honors in 1978. A second-round pick in the 1979 NFL draft, he played professionally for the Atlanta Falcons and Houston Oilers of the NFL.

== Early life ==
Howell was born in Fresno, California. He was a Parade magazine high school All-American for Fresno High School football team in 1974, and Central California Valley discus throw champion in track and field.

== College career ==
Howell attended the University of Southern California, where he played for the USC Trojans football team. As a senior in 1978, he received unanimous All-American honors.

== Professional career ==
The Houston Oilers chose Howell in the second round (forty-ninth pick overall) of the 1979 NFL Draft, and he played for the Oilers from 1979 to 1983, and Atlanta Falcons between 1983 and 1985.

== Football family ==
His son, Nick Howell, was an offensive lineman for the USC Trojans, after playing football at Bullard High School in Fresno, California.
