= John Schuhmacher =

American football player (born 1955)

No. 62
- Position: Guard/Tackle

Personal information
- Born: September 23, 1955 (age 71); Salem, Oregon, U.S.
- Listed height: 6 ft 3 in (1.91 m)
- Listed weight: 271 lb (123 kg)

Career information
- High school: Arcadia (CA)
- College: USC
- NFL draft: 1978: 12th round, 322nd overall pick

Career history
- Houston Oilers (1978–1985)

Awards and highlights
- Second-team All-Pac-8 (1977)

Career NFL statistics
- Games played: 69
- Games started: 51
- Fumble recoveries: 1
- Stats at Pro Football Reference

John Schuhmacher (born September 23, 1955) is an American former professional football player who was an offensive lineman for six seasons with the Houston Oilers of the National Football League (NFL). He played college football for the USC Trojans.
