= Dennis Thurman =

American football player and coach (born 1956)

Hawaii Rainbow Warriors
- Title: Defensive coordinator

Personal information
- Born: April 13, 1956 (age 70); Los Angeles, California
- Listed height: 5 ft 11 in (1.80 m)
- Listed weight: 176 lb (80 kg)

Career information
- Position: Defensive back (No. 32, 23)
- High school: Santa Monica (Santa Monica, California)
- College: USC (1974–1977)
- NFL draft: 1978: 11th round, 306th overall pick

Career history

Playing
- Dallas Cowboys (1978–1985); St. Louis Cardinals (1986)

Coaching
- Phoenix Cardinals (1988–1989) Defensive backs coach; Ohio Glory (1992) Defensive coordinator; USC (1993–2000) Secondary coach; Baltimore Ravens (2002–2007); Defensive assistant (2002-2003); Defensive backs coach (2004-2007); New York Jets (2008–2012); Defensive backs coach (2008-2012); Defensive coordinator (2013-2014); Buffalo Bills (2015–2016) Defensive coordinator; Memphis Express (2019) Defensive coordinator & cornerbacks coach; Jackson State (2020–2022) Defensive coordinator; Colorado (2023) Defensive quality control coach; Hawaii (2024–present) Defensive coordinator & cornerbacks coach

Awards and highlights
- As a player: National (1974); Unanimous All-American (1977); Consensus All-American (1976); 2× First-team All-Pacific-8 (1976, 1977); As a coach: 2× Pacific-10 (1993, (Note: Co-champion with Arizona and UCLA this season) 1995 (Note: Co-champion with Washington this season)); 2× SWAC (2021, 2022); 2× SWAC East (2021, 2022)

Career NFL statistics
- Forced fumbles: 7
- Fumble recoveries: 2
- Interceptions: 36
- Defensive touchdowns: 5
- Stats at Pro Football Reference
- Coaching profile at Pro Football Reference
- College Football Hall of Fame

Dennis Lee Thurman (born April 13, 1956) is an American football coach and former player who currently serves as the defensive coordinator and cornerbacks coach for Hawaii. He is a former coach in the National Football League (NFL) for the Phoenix Cardinals, the Baltimore Ravens and the New York Jets, and in the Alliance of American Football (AAF) for the Memphis Express. He played as a cornerback for the Dallas Cowboys and the St. Louis Cardinals. He played college football for the USC Trojans. Thurman was inducted into the College Football Hall of Fame in 2025.

== Early life ==
Thurman attended Santa Monica High School, where he was a quarterback and defensive back. He was a part of three CIF Division I championship teams that combined to go 39–1–1.

Thurman also played baseball and basketball. He was recruited by major league baseball teams and to play college basketball.

== College career ==
Thurman accepted a football scholarship from the University of Southern California. As a freshman, he was part of the 1974 National Champion team. Thurman played for John McKay and later for John Robinson. He started five games at flanker in his first two seasons, recording three receptions for 55 yards (18.3-yard avg.) and seven carries for 61 yards (8.7-yard avg.).

As a junior in 1976, Thurman was named the starter at free safety, leading the team and the Pacific-8 Conference with eight interceptions. He intercepted passes in seven straight contests. Thurman led the nation with in interception return yardage (180). He also led the team with 17 punts for 68 yards.

As a senior in 1977, Thurman was second on the team with three interceptions. He was named the team's MVP and its Defensive Player of the Year. He played in the 1978 Senior Bowl and was a Playboy Pre-season All-American.

Thurman is tied for sixth in school history with 13 interceptions, two of which were returned for touchdowns. He also had 77 tackles, six pass deflections and seven fumble recoveries. Thurman played on Trojan teams that won four bowl games (two Roses, a Liberty and a Bluebonnet). Teammate Ronnie Lott credited Thurman for his development as a player in his Pro Football Hall of Fame speech, stating Thurman was someone who "helped me become a better football player."

== Professional career ==
=== Dallas Cowboys ===
Thurman was selected by the Dallas Cowboys in the 11th round (306th overall) of the 1978 NFL draft, after dropping because he was considered too small and slow to play professional football. Although his college experience was at safety, he made the team as a backup cornerback. As a rookie, he also played on special teams, recovering an onside kick in Super Bowl XIII. He finished the season with 20 tackles and 2 interceptions.

In 1979, he regularly replaced outside linebacker D. D. Lewis on passing situations. He also played strong safety in place of an injured Randy Hughes. He started at cornerback in the season finale against the Washington Redskins. He had 37 tackles, one fumble recovery, one interception in the regular season and one in the divisional playoff game against the Los Angeles Rams.

In 1980, he started at free safety in place of an injured Hughes. In the ninth game against the St. Louis Cardinals, he returned an interception for a 78-yard touchdown. Although his play was inconsistent, he still tied Charlie Waters for the team lead with 5 interceptions. He also had 101 tackles (second on the team), 2 forced fumbles and 2 fumble recoveries.

In 1981, after Charlie Waters retired, cornerback Benny Barnes was moved to strong safety and rookie Michael Downs to free safety, so Thurman became the starter at right cornerback. He registered 76 tackles, one fumble recovery and 9 interceptions (third in team history), which was second on the team to Everson Walls' 11 picks. In the season opener against the Washington Redskins, he returned an interception 96 yards for a touchdown, which was the second longest in club history. He had 2 interceptions in the 28–27 win against the Miami Dolphins. In the fifteenth game against the Philadelphia Eagles, he tied a franchise record with 3 interceptions in a single-game, helping to clinch the NFC East championship. His 187 interception return yardage in the season ranked second in club history. He had 2 interceptions in the 38-0 playoff win against the Tampa Bay Buccaneers.

In 1982, he made 43 tackles and 3 interceptions. He returned a 60-yard interception for a touchdown against the Minnesota Vikings. He tied a club and an NFC playoff record with 3 interceptions, including a 39-yard return for touchdown to clinch a victory in the playoffs second round against the Green Bay Packers.

In 1983, he collected 66 tackles, one fumble recovery and led the team with 6 interceptions. He scored his fourth career touchdown when he recovered a fumble against the St. Louis Cardinals.

In 1984, he was moved to backup Downs at free safety and was more involved in third-down defensive schemes. He registered 34 tackles and 5 interceptions (second on the team).

During the 1985 season quarterback Danny White nicknamed Thurman along with fellow safety Michael Downs and cornerbacks Walls, Ron Fellows, "Thurman's Thieves", for their opportunistic play in the secondary, as they combined for 33 total interceptions. He posted 41 tackles and 5 interceptions (second on the team). He returned an interception 21 yards for a touchdown in the season opener against the Washington Redskins, contributing to a 44–14 win. He had 2 interceptions against the Cleveland Browns, that stopped 2 scoring opportunities in a 20–7 win.

Thurman was waived on August 26, 1986. He left with a franchise record of career 4 interceptions returned for touchdowns, he ranked fourth in regular season career interceptions (36), second in playoff interceptions (7) and third in interception return yardage (562). At the time, he also ranked third in league history for career playoff interceptions.

=== St. Louis Cardinals ===
On August 28, 1986, he was claimed off waivers by the St. Louis Cardinals, reuniting with head coach Gene Stallings who was his defensive secondary coach with the Cowboys. He played safety and started three games. He was released on December 22.

Thurman never missed a game during his 137-game career and finished with 36 interceptions, which he returned for 562 yards and four touchdowns, while also recovering seven fumbles.

== Coaching career ==
He made his NFL coaching debut with the Arizona Cardinals, known at the time as the Phoenix Cardinals, coaching defensive backs for two seasons (1988–89). He coached from 1993 to 2000 for his alma mater, the USC Trojans where he mentored future NFLers Chris Cash, Kris Richard, Daylon McCutcheon, Brian Kelly and Troy Polamalu.

=== Baltimore Ravens (2002–2007) ===
Thurman was part of the Baltimore Ravens coaching staff from 2002 to 2007.

=== New York Jets (2008–2014) ===
==== Defensive backs coach (2008–2012) ====
Thurman was named defensive backs coach upon the hiring of Rex Ryan as head coach of the Jets. During his tenure, he coached Darrelle Revis and Antonio Cromartie. Revis and Cromartie were vital parts of the Jets defense, especially during the Jets' playoff appearances in 2009 and 2010. Under Thurman's coaching, Revis was described as "one of the best" corners in the league. After five seasons, Thurman was promoted to defensive coordinator after the 2012 season.

==== Defensive coordinator (2013–2014) ====
Thurman was named Defensive Coordinator prior to the 2013 season. In his first season, the Jets defense allowed 24.2 points per game against. Thurman's defense was sixth in the league in his final season in New York, allowing 327.2 yards per game. They also finished in the top five among defenses against the running game. Following the 2014 season, he joined Rex Ryan's coaching staff for the Buffalo Bills.

=== Buffalo Bills (2015–2016) ===
On January 15, 2015, Thurman was hired by new head coach Rex Ryan to serve as the defensive coordinator. Thurman was credited for helping cornerback Stephon Gilmore emerge. The Bills ranked 19th in the league in defense in his first season and 14th in 2016. He was fired on January 14, 2017.

=== Memphis Express (2018) ===
In October 2018, Thurman was named defensive coordinator for the Memphis Express of the Alliance of American Football (AAF).

=== University of Hawaii (2024) ===
On January 19, 2024, the University of Hawaii Rainbow Warrior football team announced that Thurman was hired as defensive coordinator and cornerbacks coach.

== Personal life ==
Thurman is the older brother of Ulysses "Junior" Thurman, who also attended Santa Monica High School (1981) and the University of Southern California. He played defensive back in the National Football League (NFL) for the New Orleans Saints.
