= Mike Levenseller =

American football player and coach (born 1956)

No. 87, 84, 88, 73
- Position: Wide receiver

Personal information
- Born: February 21, 1956 (age 70); Bremerton, Washington, U.S.
- Listed height: 6 ft 1 in (1.85 m)
- Listed weight: 180 lb (82 kg)

Career information
- High school: Curtis Senior (University Place, Washington)
- College: Washington State
- NFL draft: 1978: 6th round, 164th overall pick

Career history

Playing
- Tampa Bay Buccaneers (1978); Buffalo Bills (1978); Cincinnati Bengals (1979–1980); Edmonton Eskimos (1982); Calgary Stampeders (1983–1984)

Coaching
- BC Lions (1986) (Asst); Toronto Argonauts (1990–1991) (WR); Washington State Cougars (1992–2011) (WR); Idaho Vandals (2012) (WR)

Awards and highlights
- Grey Cup champion (1982); 2× First-team All-Pac-8 (1976, 1977)
- Stats at Pro Football Reference

Michael Thomas Levenseller (born February 21, 1956) is an American former professional football player who was a wide receiver for three seasons in the National Football League (NFL) with the Tampa Bay Buccaneers, Buffalo Bills and Cincinnati Bengals. He played college football for the Washington State Cougars and was selected by the Oakland Raiders in the sixth round of the 1978 NFL draft. Levenseller was also a member of the Edmonton Eskimos and Calgary Stampeders of the Canadian Football League (CFL).

== Early life ==
Levenseller attended Curtis Senior High School in University Place, Washington.

== College career ==
He played college football for the Washington State Cougars. He was a Pacific-8 first-team, AP All-West Coast first-team, and AP All-America honorable mention wide receiver selection his junior and senior seasons, 1976 and 1977. He recorded 2,061 receiving yards on 121 receptions in his college career. Levenseller was inducted into the Washington State University Athletic Hall of Fame in 1992 and the 2006 Pacific Northwest Football Hall of Fame in 2006.

== Professional career ==
Levenseller was selected in the sixth round by the Oakland Raiders with the 164th pick in the 1978 NFL draft. That season, he played in two games for the Tampa Bay Buccaneers, and in two games for the Buffalo Bills. Levenseller appeared in 20 games for the Cincinnati Bengals from 1979 to 1980.

He played in nine games for the Edmonton Eskimos in 1982, winning the 70th Grey Cup. He appeared in 24 games for the Calgary Stampeders from 1983 to 1984.

== Coaching career ==
Levenseller served as a guest coach for the BC Lions in 1986, working with the wide receivers. He was wide receivers coach of the Toronto Argonauts from 1990 to 1991.

Levenseller served as wide receivers coach of the Washington State Cougars from 1992 to 2011, where he earned a reputation as a "supreme technician" and mentored many of the most prolific receivers in WSU history. He also had stints as offensive coordinator. He was wide receivers coach of the Idaho Vandals of the University of Idaho in 2012.
