= Blair Bush =

American football player (born 1956)

No. 58, 59, 51
- Positions: Center, long snapper

Personal information
- Born: November 25, 1956 (age 69); Fort Hood, Texas, U.S.
- Listed height: 6 ft 3 in (1.91 m)
- Listed weight: 268 lb (122 kg)

Career information
- High school: Palos Verdes (Palos Verdes Estates, California)
- College: Washington
- NFL draft: 1978: 1st round, 16th overall pick

Career history
- Cincinnati Bengals (1978–1982); Seattle Seahawks (1983–1988); Green Bay Packers (1989–1991); Los Angeles Rams (1992–1994)

Awards and highlights
- PFWA NFL All-Rookie Team (1978); Second-team All-American (1977); First-team All-Pac-8 (1977)

Career NFL statistics
- Games played: 246
- Games started: 161
- Fumble recoveries: 4
- Stats at Pro Football Reference

Blair Walter Bush (born November 25, 1956) is an American former professional football player who was a center and long snapper for 17 seasons in the National Football League (NFL) with four teams. He played college football for the Washington Huskies.

== Early life and college ==
Bush was born in Fort Hood, Texas, on November 25, 1956. He played high school football at Palos Verdes in Palos Verdes Estates, California and college football at the University of Washington, where he was named to the 1977 All-Pacific-8 Conference football team and the 1977 College Football All-America Team. At the University of Washington, Bush was a member of the Lambda Chi Alpha fraternity.

== Professional career ==
Bush entered the NFL in 1978. He was drafted 16th overall in the first round by the Cincinnati Bengals. He played for the Cincinnati Bengals from 1978 to 1982, the Seattle Seahawks from 1983 to 1988, the Green Bay Packers from 1989 to 1991, and the Los Angeles Rams from 1992 to 1994.

In January 1982, as a member of the Cincinnati Bengals, he played in Super Bowl XVI.
