= Rob Hertel =

American football player (born 1955)

No. 16
- Position: Quarterback

Personal information
- Born: February 21, 1955 (age 71); Montebello, California, U.S.
- Listed height: 6 ft 2 in (1.88 m)
- Listed weight: 195 lb (88 kg)

Career information
- High school: Hacienda Heights (CA) Los Altos
- College: USC
- NFL draft: 1978: 5th round, 131st overall pick

Career history
- Cincinnati Bengals (1978); Philadelphia Eagles (1980)

Career NFL statistics
- TD–INT: 0–0
- Passing yards: 9
- Passer rating: 39.6
- Stats at Pro Football Reference

Robert Alden Hertel (born February 21, 1955) is an American former professional football player who was a quarterback in the National Football League (NFL). He played college football for the USC Trojans from 1973 to 1977 and was a member of 1974 national championship team. Hertel was named MVP of the 1977 Astro Bluebonnet Bowl, going 11-15 for 254 yards and 4 touchdowns. He was selected by the Cincinnati Bengals in the fifth round of the 1978 NFL draft. Hertel also played for the Philadelphia Eagles, and was a member of their 1980 Super Bowl XV team.

He also played baseball at USC and was a member of their 1974 National Championship team. Hertel had a career batting average of .312 as a three year starting infielder. He was drafted by MLB teams numerous times, including a first round pick by the Toronto Blue Jays in January 1978, and second round by the San Diego Padres in May 1978.
