= Jed Hughes =

American football coach

Coaching career (HC unless noted)
- 1972–1973: Stanford (GA)
- 1974–1975: Michigan (LB)
- 1977–1981: UCLA (DC)
- 1982–1983: Minnesota Vikings (DB)
- 1984–1988: Pittsburgh Steelers (LB)
- 1989: Cleveland Browns (LB)

Jed Hughes is an American former football coach. Hughes worked as a graduate assistant for Stanford University football program from 1972 to 1973. In 1974, he joined Bo Schembechler's staff at the University of Michigan as a linebacker coach. He remained at Michigan for two seasons. In 1977, he joined Terry Donahue's staff at UCLA. He was UCLA's defensive coordinator from 1977 to 1981. In 1982, Hughes was hired as the secondary coach for the Minnesota Vikings. After two seasons with Minnesota, Hughes joined Chuck Noll's staff as the linebackers coach for the Pittsburgh Steelers. After five years with the Steelers, he finished his football coaching career with the Cleveland Browns in 1989.
