= 1977 NCAA Division I football rankings =

- Season: 1977
- Bowl season: 1977–78 bowl games
- Preseason No. 1: Oklahoma
- End of season champions: Notre Dame

Two human polls comprised the 1977 National Collegiate Athletic Association (NCAA) Division I football rankings. Unlike most sports, college football's governing body, the NCAA, does not bestow a national championship, instead that title is bestowed by one or more different polling agencies. There are two main weekly polls that begin in the preseason—the AP Poll and the Coaches Poll.

== Legend ==
	Increase in ranking
	Decrease in ranking
	Not ranked previous week
	National champion
(#–#)	Win–loss record
(Italics)	Number of first place votes
т	Tied with team above or below also with this symbol

== AP Poll ==
	Preseason	Week 1 Sep 12	Week 2 Sep 19	Week 3 Sep 26	Week 4 Oct 3	Week 5 Oct 10	Week 6 Oct 17	Week 7 Oct 24	Week 8 Oct 31	Week 9 Nov 7	Week 10 Nov 14	Week 11 Nov 21	Week 12 Nov 28	Week 13 (Final) Final	
1.	Oklahoma (23)	Michigan (1–0)	Michigan (2–0)	Oklahoma (3–0)	USC (4–0)	Michigan (5–0)	Michigan (6–0)	Texas (6–0)	Texas (7–0)	Texas (8–0)	Texas (9–0)	Texas (10–0)	Texas (11–0)	Notre Dame (11–1) (37 1/3)	1.
2.	Michigan (19)	USC (1–0)	USC (2–0)	USC (3–0)	Oklahoma (4–0)	Texas (4–0)	Texas (5–0)	Alabama (6–1)	Alabama (7–1)	Alabama (8–1)	Alabama (9–1)	Alabama (9–1)	Oklahoma (10–1)	Alabama (11–1) (19 1/3)	2.
3.	Notre Dame (10)	Notre Dame (1–0)	Oklahoma (2–0)	Michigan (3–0)	Michigan (4–0)	Colorado (5–0)	Alabama (5–1)	Ohio State (6–1)	Oklahoma (7–1)	Oklahoma (8–1)	Oklahoma (9–1)	Oklahoma (9–1)	Alabama (10–1)	Arkansas (11–1) (5 1/3)	3.
4.	USC (3)	Alabama (1–0)	Ohio State (2–0)	Penn State (3–0)	Ohio State (3–1)	Alabama (4–1)	Ohio State (5–1)	Oklahoma (6–1)	Ohio State (7–1)	Ohio State (8–1)	Ohio State (9–1)	Michigan (10–1)	Michigan (10–1)	Texas (11–1) (2)	4.
5.	Ohio State (2)	Oklahoma (1–0)	Penn State (2–0)	Texas A&M (3–0)	Texas (3–0)	Ohio State (4–1)	USC (5–1)	Notre Dame (5–1)	Notre Dame (6–1)	Notre Dame (7–1)	Michigan (9–1)	Notre Dame (9–1)	Notre Dame (9–1)	Penn State (11–1)	5.
6.	Alabama (1)	Ohio State (1–0)	Texas A&M (2–0)	Ohio State (2–1)	Colorado (4–0)	USC (4–1)	Oklahoma (5–1)	Michigan (6–1)	Michigan (7–1)	Michigan (8–1)	Notre Dame (8–1)	Arkansas (9–1)	Arkansas (10–1)	Kentucky (10–1)	6.
7.	Pittsburgh (2)	Texas A&M (1–0)	Texas Tech (2–0)	Colorado (3–0)	Alabama (3–1) т	Oklahoma (4–1)	Colorado (5–0–1)	Kentucky (6–1)	Kentucky (7–1)	Kentucky (8–1)	Kentucky (9–1)	Kentucky (10–1)	Kentucky (10–1)	Oklahoma (10–2)	7.
8.	Texas Tech (1)	Texas Tech (1–0)	Colorado (2–0)	Texas (2–0)	Arkansas (4–0) т	Arkansas (4–0)	Kentucky (5–1)	Arkansas (5–1)	Arkansas (6–1)	Arkansas (7–1)	Arkansas (8–1)	Ohio State (9–2)	Penn State (10–1)	Pittsburgh (9–2–1)	8.
9.	Texas A&M (1)	Houston (0–0)	Texas (2–0)	Florida (2–0)	Nebraska (3–1)	Nebraska (4–1)	Arkansas (4–1)	Penn State (6–1)	Penn State (7–1)	Penn State (8–1)	Penn State (9–1)	Penn State (9–1)	Ohio State (9–2)	Michigan (10–2)	9.
10.	Maryland	Penn State (1–0)	Alabama (1–1)	Alabama (2–1)	Penn State (3–1)	Penn State (4–1)	Penn State (5–1)	USC (5–2)	Texas A&M (6–1)	Pittsburgh (7–1–1)	Pittsburgh (8–1–1)	Pittsburgh (8–1–1)	Pittsburgh (8–2–1)	Washington (8–4)	10.
11.	UCLA	Maryland (1–0)	Notre Dame (1–1)	Nebraska (2–1)	Notre Dame (3–1)	Notre Dame (3–1)	Notre Dame (4–1)	Texas A&M (5–1)	Nebraska (6–2)	Texas A&M (6–1)	Nebraska (8–2)	Nebraska (8–2)	Clemson (8–2–1)	Ohio State (9–3)	11.
12.	Colorado	Colorado (1–0)	Mississippi State (2–0)	Arkansas (3–0)	Texas A&M (3–1)	Kentucky (4–1)	Texas A&M (4–1)	Nebraska (5–2)	Pittsburgh (6–1–1)	Nebraska (7–2)	Arizona State (8–1)	Texas A&M (7–2)	Nebraska (8–3)	Nebraska (9–3)	12.
13.	Penn State	Mississippi State (2–0)	Florida (1–0)	Texas Tech (2–1)	BYU (3–0)	Texas A&M (3–1)	Texas Tech (5–1)	Pittsburgh (5–1–1)	Clemson (7–1)	BYU (7–1)	Florida State (8–1)	Clemson (8–2–1)	Washington (7–4)	USC (8–4)	13.
14.	Houston	UCLA (0–0)	Nebraska (1–1)	Notre Dame (2–1)	California (4–0)	Wisconsin (5–0)	Pittsburgh (4–1–1)	Texas Tech (5–1)	BYU (6–1)	USC (6–3)	Texas A&M (6–2)	Washington (7–4)	North Carolina (8–2–1)	Florida State (10–2)	14.
15.	Nebraska	Oklahoma State (1–0)	Washington State (2–0)	BYU (2–0)	Pittsburgh (3–1)	Texas Tech (4–1)	California (5–1)	Colorado (5–1–1)	Florida State (6–1)	Clemson (7–1–1)	Clemson (7–2–1)	North Carolina (8–2–1)	Arizona State (9–2)	Stanford (9–3)	15.
16.	Mississippi State	Pittsburgh (0–1)	Arkansas (2–0)	Pittsburgh (2–1)	Kentucky (3–1)	LSU (3–1)	Iowa State (5–1)	Clemson (6–1)	USC (5–3)	Florida State (7–1)	Texas Tech (7–2)	San Diego State (9–1)	San Diego State (9–1)	San Diego State (10–1)	16.
17.	Arizona State	Georgia (1–0)	West Virginia (2–0)	California (3–0)	Texas Tech (3–1)	Pittsburgh (3–1–1)	BYU (4–1)	BYU (5–1)	California (6–2)	Arizona State (7–1)	BYU (7–2)	UCLA (7–3)	BYU (9–2) т	North Carolina (8–3–1)	17.
18.	Florida	Texas (1–0)	UCLA (1–1)	Mississippi State (2–1)	LSU (2–1)	Florida (2–1–1)	Nebraska (4–2)	Florida (3–1–1)	LSU (5–2)	Texas Tech (6–2)	North Carolina (7–2–1)	BYU (8–2)	Texas A&M (7–3) т	Arizona State (9–3)	18.
19.	Georgia	Florida (0–0)	Houston (1–1)	Houston (2–1)	Wisconsin (4–0)	Houston (3–1)	Florida (2–1–1)	Minnesota (5–2)	Arizona State (6–1) т	North Carolina (6–2–1)	Washington (6–4)	Arizona State (8–2)	Florida State (8–2)	Clemson (8–3–1)	19.
20.	Oklahoma State	BYU (1–0)	BYU (1–0)	Arizona State (2–0)	Florida (2–1)	California (4–1)	Clemson (5–1)	Florida State (5–1)	Iowa State (6–2) т	Colgate (9–0)	UCLA (7–3)	Florida State (8–2)	USC (7–4)	BYU (9–2)	20.
	Preseason	Week 1 Sep 12	Week 2 Sep 19	Week 3 Sep 26	Week 4 Oct 3	Week 5 Oct 10	Week 6 Oct 17	Week 7 Oct 24	Week 8 Oct 31	Week 9 Nov 7	Week 10 Nov 14	Week 11 Nov 21	Week 12 Nov 28	Week 13 (Final) Final	
		Dropped: Nebraska; Arizona State	Dropped: Maryland; Oklahoma State; Pittsburgh; Georgia	Dropped: Washington State; West Virginia; UCLA	Dropped: Mississippi State; Houston; Arizona State	Dropped: BYU	Dropped: Wisconsin; LSU; Houston	Dropped: California; Iowa State	Dropped: Texas Tech; Colorado; Florida; Minnesota	Dropped: California; LSU; Iowa State	Dropped: USC; Colgate	Dropped: Texas Tech	Dropped: UCLA	Dropped: Texas A&M	

== Coaches Poll ==
(Note: Per an agreement with the AFCA, teams under NCAA probation were ineligible to be ranked in the Coaches Poll. Notable teams on probation included Kentucky (10–1) and Michigan State (7–3–1).)

	Week 1 Sep 12	Week 2 Sep 19	Week 3 Sep 26	Week 4 Oct 3	Week 5 Oct 10	Week 6 Oct 17	Week 7 Oct 24	Week 8 Oct 31	Week 9 Nov 7	Week 10 Nov 14 (Note: Less than 20 teams received votes in this poll.)	Week 11 Nov 21	Week 12 Nov 28	Week 13 Jan 3 (Final)	
1.	Michigan (1–0)	Michigan (2–0)	USC (3–0)	USC (4–0)	Michigan (5–0)	Michigan (6–0)	Texas (6–0)	Texas (7–0)	Texas (8–0)	Texas (9–0)	Texas (10–0)	Texas (11–0)	Notre Dame (11–1) (23)	1.
2.	USC (1–0)	USC (2–0)	Oklahoma (3–0)	Michigan (4–0)	Texas (4–0)	Texas (5–0)	Alabama (6–1)	Alabama (7–1)	Alabama (8–1)	Oklahoma (9–1)	Oklahoma (9–1)	Oklahoma (10–1)	Alabama (11–1) (13)	2.
3.	Alabama (1–0)	Ohio State (2–0)	Michigan (3–0)	Oklahoma (4–0)	Colorado (5–0)	Alabama (5–1)	Oklahoma (6–1)	Oklahoma (7–1)	Oklahoma (8–1)	Alabama (9–1)	Alabama (9–1)	Alabama (10–1)	Arkansas (11–1) (2)	3.
4.	Notre Dame (1–0)	Oklahoma (2–0)	Penn State (3–0)	Texas (3–0)	Alabama (4–1)	USC (5–1)	Ohio State (6–1)	Ohio State (7–1)	Ohio State (8–1)	Ohio State (9–1)	Michigan (10–1)	Michigan (10–1)	Penn State (11–1)	4.
5.	Ohio State (1–0)	Penn State (2–0)	Texas A&M (3–0)	Colorado (4–0)	Ohio State (4–1)	Ohio State (5–1)	Notre Dame (5–1)	Notre Dame (6–1)	Notre Dame (7–1)	Michigan (9–1)	Notre Dame (9–1)	Notre Dame (9–1)	Texas (11–1) (1)	5.
6.	Oklahoma (1–0)	Texas Tech (2–0)	Colorado (3–0)	Ohio State (3–1)	Oklahoma (4–1)	Oklahoma (5–1)	Michigan (6–1)	Michigan (7–1)	Michigan (8–1)	Notre Dame (8–1)	Arkansas (9–1)	Arkansas (10–1)	Oklahoma (10–2)	6.
7.	Texas A&M (1–0)	Texas A&M (2–0)	Ohio State (2–1)	Nebraska (3–1)	USC (4–1)	Colorado (5–0–1)	Arkansas (5–1)	Penn State (7–1)	Arkansas (7–1)	Arkansas (8–1)	Ohio State (9–2)	Penn State (10–1)	Pittsburgh (9–2–1)	7.
8.	Texas Tech (1–0)	Colorado (2–0)	Texas (2–0)	Alabama (3–1)	Arkansas (4–0)	Arkansas (4–1)	Penn State (6–1)	Arkansas (6–1)	Penn State (8–1)	Penn State (9–1)	Penn State (9–1)	Ohio State (9–2)	Michigan (10–2)	8.
9.	Penn State (1–0)	Texas (2–0)	Florida (2–0)	Arkansas (4–0)	Nebraska (4–1)	Penn State (5–1)	Texas A&M (5–1)	Pittsburgh (6–1–1)	Pittsburgh (7–1–1)	Pittsburgh (8–1–1)	Pittsburgh (8–1–1)	Pittsburgh (8–2–1)	Washington (8–4)	9.
10.	Maryland (1–0)	Florida (1–0)	Nebraska (2–1)	California (4–0)	Penn State (4–1)	Notre Dame (4–1)	Nebraska (5–2)	Nebraska (6–2)	Nebraska (7–2)	Nebraska (8–2)	Nebraska (8–2)	Clemson (8–2–1)	Nebraska (9–3)	10.
11.	Colorado (1–0)	Nebraska (1–1)	Arkansas (3–0)	Penn State (3–1)	LSU (3–1)	Texas A&M (4–1)	USC (5–2)	Texas A&M (6–1)	Texas A&M (6–1)	Arizona State (8–1)	Texas A&M (7–2)	North Carolina (8–2–1)	Florida State (10–2)	11.
12.	Houston (1–0)	Alabama (1–1)	Alabama (2–1)	BYU (3–0)	Notre Dame (3–1) т	Pittsburgh (4–1–1)	Pittsburgh (5–1–1)	Iowa State (6–2)	BYU (7–1)	Texas A&M (6–2)	Iowa State (8–3)	Arizona State (9–2)	Ohio State (9–3) т	12.
13.	Texas (1–0) т	Washington State (2–0)	Pittsburgh (2–1)	Notre Dame (3–1)	Pittsburgh (3–1–1) т	Texas Tech (5–1)	Texas Tech (5–1)	BYU (6–1) т	Arizona State (7–1)	Florida State (8–1)	North Texas State (9–2)	Nebraska (8–3)	USC (8–4) т	13.
14.	UCLA (1–0) т	Notre Dame (1–1)	BYU (2–0)	Pittsburgh (3–1)	Texas A&M (3–1)	California (5–1)	Colorado (5–1–1)	Clemson (7–1) т	USC (6–3)	North Texas State (8–2)	Clemson (8–2–1)	BYU (9–2) т	North Carolina (8–3–1)	14.
15.	Florida (0–0)	Arkansas (2–0)	Notre Dame (2–1)	Houston (3–1)	Texas Tech (4–1) т	BYU (4–1)	BYU (5–1)	Florida State (6–1)	Colorado (6–2–1)	Clemson (7–2–1)	North Carolina (8–2–1)	Iowa State (8–3) т	Stanford (9–3)	15.
16.	Pittsburgh (0–1)	Mississippi State (2–0)	California (3–0)	Texas Tech (3–1)	Wisconsin (5–0) т	North Texas State (6–1)	Clemson (6–1) т	Arizona State (6–1) т	Clemson (7–1–1) т	North Carolina (7–2–1) т	Washington (7–4)	Washington (7–4) т	BYU (9–2) т	16.
17.	BYU (1–0)	BYU (1–0) т	Houston (2–1)	Texas A&M (3–1)	Houston (3–1)	Nebraska (4–2)	North Texas State (7–1) т	California (6–2) т	Florida State (7–1) т	Texas Tech (7–2) т	UCLA (7–3)	North Texas State (9–2)	North Texas State (9–2) т	17.
18.	South Carolina (2–0)	Pittsburgh (1–1) т	Arizona State (2–0)	Florida (2–1)	BYU (3–1) т	Iowa State (5–1)	Oklahoma State (4–3)	Stanford (6–2)	North Texas State (8–2)	UCLA (7–3) т	BYU (8–2)	San Diego State (10–1) т	Arizona State (9–3)	18.
19.	Iowa State (1–0) т	Oklahoma State (1–1)	Texas Tech (2–1)	LSU (2–1)	North Texas State (5–1) т	Clemson (5–1)	Iowa State (5–2)	NC State (6–3)		Iowa State (7–3)	Colorado State (8–2–1)	Texas A&M (7–3) т	NC State (8–4) т	19.
20.	Georgia (1–0) т Oklahoma State (1–0) т	West Virginia (2–0)	Wisconsin (3–0)	Wisconsin (4–0)	NC State (5–1)	Arizona State (4–1)	Arizona State (5–1)	North Texas State (7–2)			Stanford (8–3)	USC (7–4)	San Diego State (10–1) т	20.
	Week 1 Sep 12	Week 2 Sep 19	Week 3 Sep 26	Week 4 Oct 3	Week 5 Oct 10	Week 6 Oct 17	Week 7 Oct 24	Week 8 Oct 31	Week 9 Nov 7	Week 10 Nov 14	Week 11 Nov 21	Week 12 Nov 28	Week 13 Jan 3 (Final)	
		Dropped: Houston; Maryland; UCLA; Georgia; South Carolina; Iowa State	Dropped: Mississippi State; Washington State; West Virginia; Oklahoma State	Dropped: Arizona State	Dropped: California; Florida	Dropped: Wisconsin; LSU; Houston; NC State	Dropped: California	Dropped: USC; Texas Tech; Colorado; Oklahoma State	Dropped: Iowa State; California; Stanford; NC State	Dropped: BYU; USC; Colorado	Dropped: Arizona State; Florida State; Texas Tech	Dropped: UCLA; Colorado State; Stanford	Dropped: Clemson; Texas A&M; Iowa State	
