= 2011 Oklahoma State Cowboys football team =

American college football season

2011 Oklahoma State Cowboys football

National champion (Colley) Big 12 champion Fiesta Bowl champion

Fiesta Bowl, W 41–38^{OT} vs. Stanford
- Conference: Big 12 Conference

Ranking
- Coaches: No. 3
- AP: No. 3
- Record: 12–1 (8–1 Big 12)
- Head coach: Mike Gundy (7th season)
- Offensive coordinator: Todd Monken (1st season)
- Offensive scheme: Air raid
- Co-defensive coordinators: Bill Young (3rd season); Glenn Spencer (1st season)
- Base defense: 4–3
- Home stadium: Boone Pickens Stadium

2011 Big 12 Conference football standings
	Conf.			Overall
Team	W		L	W		L
No. 3 Oklahoma State $	8	–	1	12	–	1
No. 15 Kansas State	7	–	2	10	–	3
No. 13 Baylor	6	–	3	10	–	3
No. 16 Oklahoma	6	–	3	10	–	3
Missouri	5	–	4	8	–	5
Texas	4	–	5	8	–	5
Texas A&M	4	–	5	7	–	6
Iowa State	3	–	6	6	–	7
Texas Tech	2	–	7	5	–	7
Kansas	0	–	9	2	–	10
$ – BCS representative as conference champion; Rankings from AP Poll

The 2011 Oklahoma State Cowboys football team represented Oklahoma State University in the 2011 NCAA Division I FBS football season. The Cowboys were led by seventh year head coach Mike Gundy and played their home games at Boone Pickens Stadium. They are a member of the Big 12 Conference.

The 2011 season was arguably the best in the Cowboys' 112-year football history. They opened the season with 10 straight wins, in the process rising to #2 in the AP Poll—the school's highest-ever ranking in a major poll. After unexpectedly losing to Iowa State in Ames, they ultimately finished the regular season 11–1, including a 44–10 win over rival Oklahoma for their first win in the Bedlam Series since 2002. They also won their first Big 12 title and their first outright conference title since winning the 1948 Missouri Valley Conference title. They were invited to the Fiesta Bowl, their first Bowl Championship Series bid and the second major-bowl appearance in school history, where they defeated Stanford 41–38 in overtime. The Colley Matrix, an NCAA-designated major selector, chose OSU as national champions.

== Big 12 media poll ==
The Big 12 preseason prediction poll, as voted on by members of the media, was released on July 20, 2011. The Cowboys were predicted to finish third in the conference, though they also received a first place vote.

== Schedule ==
Date	Time	Opponent	Rank	Site	TV	Result	Attendance
September 3	6:00 p.m.	Louisiana–Lafayette*	No. 9	Boone Pickens Stadium; Stillwater, OK	FCS	W 61–34	55,382
September 8	7:00 p.m.	Arizona*	No. 9	Boone Pickens Stadium; Stillwater, OK	ESPN	W 37–14	54,654
September 18^{A}	12:15 a.m.^{A}	at Tulsa*	No. 7	Chapman Stadium; Tulsa, OK (rivalry)	FSN	W 59–33	24,563
September 24	2:30 p.m.	at No. 8 Texas A&M	No. 7	Kyle Field; College Station, TX	ABC/ESPN2	W 30–29	87,358
October 8	2:30 p.m.	Kansas	No. 6	Boone Pickens Stadium; Stillwater, OK		W 70–28	58,030
October 15	2:30 p.m.	at No. 22 Texas	No. 6	Darrell K Royal–Texas Memorial Stadium; Austin, TX	ABC/ESPN	W 38–26	100,101
October 22	11:00 a.m.	at Missouri	No. 6	Faurot Field; Columbia, MO	FX	W 45–24	64,202
October 29	2:30 p.m.	Baylor^{†}	No. 3	Boone Pickens Stadium; Stillwater, OK	ABC/ESPN	W 59–24	58,274
November 5	7:00 p.m.	No. 17 Kansas State	No. 3	Boone Pickens Stadium; Stillwater, OK	ABC/ESPN2	W 52–45	58,895
November 12	11:00 a.m.	at Texas Tech	No. 2	Jones AT&T Stadium; Lubbock, TX	ABC	W 66–6	59,059
November 18	7:00 p.m.	at Iowa State	No. 2	Jack Trice Stadium; Ames, IA	ESPN	L 31–37 ^{2OT}	52,027
December 3	7:00 p.m.	No. 10 Oklahoma	No. 3	Boone Pickens Stadium; Stillwater, OK (Bedlam Game)	ABC	W 44–10	58,141
January 2, 2012	7:30 p.m.	vs. No. 4 Stanford*	No. 3	University of Phoenix Stadium; Glendale, AZ (Fiesta Bowl)	ESPN	W 41–38 ^{OT}	69,927
*Non-conference game; ^{†}Homecoming; Rankings from AP Poll released prior to the game; All times are in Central time; Source:

- ^A Originally scheduled to kick off at 9:00 p.m. on 9/17 but was delayed past midnight due to lightning.

== Personnel ==
2011 Oklahoma State Cowboys football team roster
Players
Coaches
Offense

Pos.	#	Name	Class
QB	3	Brandon Weeden	Sr
RB	1	Joseph Randle	So
OT	73	Levy Adcock	Sr
OC	74	Grant Garner
G	68	Lane Taylor	Jr
WR	81	Justin Blackmon	Jr
WR	25	Josh Cooper	Sr
WR	5	Josh Stewart	Fr

Defense

Pos.	#	Name	Class
DL		Ryan Robinson	Jr
DL	90	Joe Okafor	Fr
LB	11	Shaun Lewis	So
DB	19	Brodrick Brown
DB	4	Justin Gilbert	So
DB	10	Markelle Martin	Sr

Special teams

Pos.	#	Name	Class
K	13	Quinn Sharp	Jr

Head coach

- Mike Gundy

Coordinators/assistant coaches

- Todd Monken, Offensive coordinator
- Bill Young, Co-Defensive coordinator
- Glenn Spencer, Co-Defensive coordinator

Legend

- (C) Team captain
- (S) Suspended
- (I) Ineligible
- Injured
- Redshirt

=== Coaching staff ===
Name	Position	Seasons at Oklahoma State	Alma mater
Mike Gundy	Head Coach	6	Oklahoma State (1989)
Todd Monken	Offensive coordinator/Quarterbacks	0	Knox College (1989)
Jemal Singleton	Running backs	0	Air Force (1999)
Kasey Dunn	Wide receivers	0	Idaho (1992)
Doug Meacham	Inside Receivers	6	Oklahoma State (1987)
Joe Wickline	Offensive Line Coach	6	Florida (1983)
Bill Young	Co-defensive Coordinator/Defensive Line Coach	2	Oklahoma State (1968)
Glenn Spencer	Co-defensive Coordinator/Linebackers	3	Georgia Tech (1987)
Jason Jones	Cornerbacks	3	Alabama (2001)
Joe DeForest	Associate head coach/Special Teams/Safeties	10	Southwestern Louisiana (1987)
Rob Glass	Strength and conditioning coach	6	Oklahoma State (1983)

== Rankings ==
Ranking movements Legend: ██ Increase in ranking ██ Decrease in ranking
	Week															
Poll	Pre	1	2	3	4	5	6	7	8	9	10	11	12	13	14	Final
AP	9	9	8	7	5	6	6	6	3	3	2	2	4	3	3	3
Coaches	8	7	7	6	6	7	7	6	4	4	3	2	5	5	3	3
Harris	Not released						6	6	3	3	2	2	5	5	3	Not released
BCS	Not released							4	3	3	2	2	4	3	3	Not released

== Game summaries ==
=== Louisiana–Lafayette ===
Louisiana–Lafayette at No. 9 Oklahoma State

Team	1	2	3	4	Total
Ragin' Cajuns	3	7	10	14	34
• No. 9 Cowboys	10	24	10	17	61

- Date: September 3
- Location: Boone Pickens Stadium, Stillwater, OK
- Game start: 6:00 p.m. CDT
- Elapsed time: 3:39
- Game attendance: 55,382
- Game weather: Sunny, 100 °F (38 °C), Wind: ENE 10 mph
- Referee: Tom Walker
- TV announcers (FCS): Steve Physioc (Play-by-play), Yogi Roth (Color) & Desmond Purnell (Sideline)

Scoring summary
1	10:48	OSU	Quinn Sharp 27-yard field goal	OSU 3–0
1	3:16	OSU	Joseph Randle 4-yard run (Quinn Sharp kick)	OSU 10–0
1	0:16	ULL	Brett Baer 23-yard field goal	OSU 10–3
2	11:17	OSU	Jeremy Smith 1-yard run (Quinn Sharp kick)	OSU 17–3
2	8:38	OSU	Josh Cooper 15-yard pass from Brandon Weeden (Quinn Sharp kick)	OSU 24–3
2	6:36	OSU	Joseph Randle 4-yard run (Quinn Sharp kick)	OSU 31–3
2	1:31	ULL	Dwight Bentley 38-yard interception return (Brett Baer kick)	OSU 31–10
2	0:00	OSU	Quinn Sharp 22-yard field goal	OSU 34–10
3	8:17	OSU	Quinn Sharp 46-yard field goal	OSU 37–10
3	2:23	OSU	Tracy Moore 19-yard pass from Brandon Weeden (Quinn Sharp kick)	OSU 44–10
3	1:23	ULL	Jemarlous Moten 50-yard interception return (Brett Baer kick)	OSU 44–17
4	14:55	OSU	Michael Harrison 15-yard pass from Brandon Weeden (Quinn Sharp kick)	OSU 51–17
4	8:14	ULL	Blaine Gautier 1-yard run (Brett Baer kick)	OSU 51–24
4	5:36	OSU	Quinn Sharp 23-yard field goal	OSU 54–24
4	2:52	OSU	Isaiah Anderson 7-yard pass from Clint Chelf (Quinn Sharp kick)	OSU 61–24
4	0:17	ULL	Qyendarius Griffin 3-yard run (Brett Baer kick)	OSU 61–31

Statistics	ULL	OKST
First downs	19	31
Total yards	320	666
Rushing yards	108	208
Passing yards	212	458
Turnovers	2	3
Time of possession	31:00	29:00

Team	Category	Player	Statistics
Louisiana–Lafayette	Passing	Blaine Gautier	13/26, 106 yards, INT
Louisiana–Lafayette	Rushing	Qyen Griffin	9 rushes, 37 yards, TD
Louisiana–Lafayette	Receiving	Javone Lawson	3 receptions, 67 yards
Oklahoma State	Passing	Brandon Weeden	24/39, 388 yards, 3 TD, 3 INT
Oklahoma State	Rushing	Joseph Randle	22 rushes, 129 yards, 2 TD
Oklahoma State	Receiving	Justin Blackmon	8 receptions, 144 yards

=== Arizona ===
Arizona at No. 9 Oklahoma State

Team	1	2	3	4	Total
Wildcats	0	0	7	7	14
• No. 9 Cowboys	14	7	6	10	37

- Date: September 8
- Location: Boone Pickens Stadium, Stillwater, OK
- Game start: 7:00 p.m. CDT
- Elapsed time: 3:16
- Game attendance: 54,654
- Game weather: Sunny, 81 °F (27 °C), Wind: NNE 14 mph
- Referee: Scott Novak
- TV announcers (ESPN): Rece Davis (Play-by-play), Craig James (Color), Jesse Palmer (Color) & Jenn Brown (Sideline)

Scoring summary
1	11:30	OSU	Joseph Randle 1-yard run (Quinn Sharp kick)	OSU 7–0
1	2:54	OSU	Justin Blackmon 3-yard pass from Brandon Weeden (Quinn Sharp kick)	OSU 14–0
2	13:30	OSU	Joseph Randle 4-yard run (Quinn Sharp kick)	OSU 21–0
3	7:38	ARIZ	Keola Antolin 1-yard run (Jaime Salazar kick)	OSU 21–7
3	0:30	OSU	Justin Blackmon 8-yard pass from Brandon Weeden (kick failed)	OSU 28–7
4	12:32	OSU	Jeremy Smith 6-yard run (Quinn Sharp kick)	OSU 35–7
4	10:03	ARIZ	Dan Buckner 54-yard pass from Nick Foles (Jamie Salazar kick)	OSU 35–14
4	3:03	OSU	Quinn Sharp 18-yard field goal	OSU 38–14

Statistics	ARIZ	OKST
First downs	21	25
Total yards	439	594
Rushing yards	41	197
Passing yards	398	397
Turnovers	1	1
Time of possession	28:38	31:22

Team	Category	Player	Statistics
Arizona	Passing	Nick Foles	37/51, 398 yards, TD
Arizona	Rushing	Keola Antolin	13 rushes, 22 yards, TD
Arizona	Receiving	Dan Buckner	10 receptions, 142 yards, TD
Oklahoma State	Passing	Brandon Weeden	42/53, 397 yards, 2 TD, INT
Oklahoma State	Rushing	Joseph Randle	15 rushes, 121 yards, 2 TD
Oklahoma State	Receiving	Justin Blackmon	12 receptions, 128 yards, 2 TD

=== at Tulsa ===
No. 7 Oklahoma State at Tulsa

Team	1	2	3	4	Total
• No. 7 Cowboys	14	17	21	7	59
Golden Hurricane	3	3	20	7	33

- Date: September 17
- Location: Chapman Stadium, Tulsa, OK
- Game start: 12:00 a.m. CDT
- Elapsed time: 3:19
- Game attendance: 24,563
- Game weather: Cloudy, 66 °F (19 °C), Wind: SE 6 mph
- Referee: Randy Smith
- TV announcers (FSN): Ron Thulin (Play-by-play), J. C. Pearson (Color) & Jeremy Bloom (Sideline)

Scoring summary
1	8:07	TLSA	Kevin Fitzpatrick 25-yard field goal	TLSA 3–0
1	7:52	OSU	Justin Gilbert 96-yard kickoff return (Quinn Sharp kick)	OSU 7–3
1	4:57	OSU	Hubert Anyiam 36-yard pass from Brandon Weeden (Quinn Sharp kick)	OSU 14–3
2	14:22	OSU	Joseph Randle 1-yard run (Quinn Sharp kick)	OSU 21–3
2	9:37	TLSA	Kevin Fitzpatrick 34-yard field goal	OSU 21–6
2	7:59	OSU	Quinn Sharp 35-yard field goal	OSU 24–6
2	5:26	OSU	Joseph Randle 5-yard run (Quinn Sharp kick)	OSU 31–6
3	11:57	OSU	Joseph Randle 11-yard run (Quinn Sharp kick)	OSU 38–6
3	9:38	OSU	Jeremy Smith 6-yard run (Quinn Sharp kick)	OSU 45–6
3	9:27	TLSA	Ja'Terian Douglas 80-yard run (kick failed)	OSU 45–12
3	9:19	TLSA	Bryan Burnham 43-yard pass from Kalen Henderson (Kevin Fitzpatrick kick)	OSU 45–19
3	7:04	OSU	Isaiah Anderson 24-yard pass from Brandon Weeden (Quinn Sharp kick)	OSU 52–19
3	4:07	TLSA	Bryan Burnham 14-yard pass from Kalen Henderson (Kevin Fitzpatrick kick)	OSU 52–26
4	7:34	OSU	Justin Blackmon 4-yard pass from Brandon Weeden (Quinn Sharp kick)	OSU 59–26
4	3:35	TLSA	Ja'Terian Douglas 42-yard run (Kevin Fitzpatrick kick)	OSU 59–33

Statistics	OKST	TLSA
First downs	32	27
Total yards	543	482
Rushing yards	174	365
Passing yards	369	117
Turnovers	2	6
Time of possession	29:46	30:14

Team	Category	Player	Statistics
Oklahoma State	Passing	Brandon Weeden	29/39, 369 yards, 3 TD, 2 INT
Oklahoma State	Rushing	Joseph Randle	25 rushes, 128 yards, 3 TD
Oklahoma State	Receiving	Josh Cooper	7 receptions, 78 yards
Tulsa	Passing	Kalen Henderson	6/20, 104 yards, 2 TD, 3 INT
Tulsa	Rushing	Ja'Terian Douglas	12 rushes, 173 yards, 2 TD
Tulsa	Receiving	Bryan Burnham	3 receptions, 68 yards, 2 TD

=== at No. 8 Texas A&M ===
No. 7 Oklahoma State at No. 8 Texas A&M

Team	1	2	3	4	Total
• No. 7 Cowboys	3	0	21	6	30
No. 8 Aggies	10	10	0	9	29

- Date: September 24
- Location: Kyle Field, College Station, TX
- Game start: 2:30 p.m. CDT
- Elapsed time: 3:43
- Game attendance: 87,358
- Game weather: Sunny, 91 °F (33 °C), Wind: W/SW 6 mph
- Referee: Scott Novak
- TV announcers (ABC/ESPN2): Sean McDonough (Play-by-play), Matt Millen (Color) & Jeannine Edwards (Sideline)

Scoring summary
1	13:59	A&M	Ryan Tannehill 65-yard run (Randy Bullock kick)	A&M 7–0
1	9:38	OSU	Quinn Sharp 27-yard field goal	A&M 7–3
1	1:35	A&M	Randy Bullock 43-yard field goal	A&M 10–3
2	10:34	A&M	Jeff Fuller 17-yard pass from Ryan Tannehill (Randy Bullock kick)	A&M 17–3
2	1:51	A&M	Randy Bullock 35-yard field goal	A&M 20–3
3	12:24	OSU	Jeremy Smith 13-yard run (Quinn Sharp kick)	A&M 20–10
3	7:33	OSU	Justin Blackmon 11-yard pass from Brandon Weeden (Quinn Sharp kick)	A&M 20–17
3	3:33	OSU	Tracy Moore 4-yard pass from Brandon Weeden (Quinn Sharp kick)	OSU 24–20
4	14:06	OSU	Quinn Sharp 24-yard field goal	OSU 27–20
4	6:24	OSU	Quinn Sharp 18-yard field goal	OSU 30–20
4	2:20	A&M	Jeff Fuller 4-yard pass from Ryan Tannehill (Randy Bullock kick)	OSU 30–27
4	0:00	A&M	Safety, ball through end zone	OSU 30–29

Statistics	OKST	TAMU
First downs	33	25
Total yards	484	471
Rushing yards	46	162
Passing yards	438	309
Turnovers	1	4
Time of possession	33:03	26:57

Team	Category	Player	Statistics
Oklahoma State	Passing	Brandon Weeden	47/60, 438 yards, 2 TD
Oklahoma State	Rushing	Joseph Randle	21 rushes, 83 yards
Oklahoma State	Receiving	Josh Cooper	11 receptions, 123 yards
Texas A&M	Passing	Ryan Tannehill	28/47, 309 yards, 2 TD, 3 INT
Texas A&M	Rushing	Ryan Tannehill	7 rushes, 69 yards, TD
Texas A&M	Receiving	Ryan Swope	7 receptions, 105 yards

Oklahoma State won consecutive games for the first time at Kyle Field as Cowboys' fans chanted "Big 12, Big 12" in the final conference matchup between the two teams. Brandon Weeden threw for a school-record 483 yards.

=== Kansas ===
Kansas at No. 6 Oklahoma State

Team	1	2	3	4	Total
Jayhawks	7	0	7	14	28
• No. 6 Cowboys	35	21	7	7	70

- Date: October 8
- Location: Boone Pickens Stadium, Stillwater, OK
- Game start: 2:30 p.m. CDT
- Elapsed time: 3:00
- Game attendance: 58,030
- Game weather: Partly Cloudy, 83 °F (28 °C), Wind: SSE 21 mph
- Referee: Dan Romeo

Statistics	KU	OKST
First downs	24	27
Total yards	478	600
Rushing yards	153	106
Passing yards	325	494
Turnovers	4	0
Time of possession	35:14	24:46

Team	Category	Player	Statistics
Kansas	Passing	Jordan Webb	25/36, 316 yards, 2 TD, 2 INT
Kansas	Rushing	Tony Pierson	6 rushes, 54 yards, TD
Kansas	Receiving	Tim Biere	7 receptions, 93 yards, TD
Oklahoma State	Passing	Brandon Weeden	24/28, 288 yards, 5 TD
Oklahoma State	Rushing	Jeremy Smith	3 rushes, 39 yards, TD
Oklahoma State	Receiving	Hubert Anyiam	5 receptions, 85 yards, 2 TD

=== at No. 22 Texas ===
No. 6 Oklahoma State at No. 22 Texas

Team	1	2	3	4	Total
• No. 6 Cowboys	7	14	17	0	38
No. 22 Longhorns	0	10	14	2	26

- Date: October 15
- Location: Darrell K Royal–Texas Memorial Stadium, Austin, TX
- Game start: 2:30 p.m. CDT
- Elapsed time: 3:27
- Game attendance: 100,101
- Game weather: Sunny, 83 °F (28 °C), Wind: S 8 mph
- Referee: Mike Defee
- TV announcers (ABC/ESPN): Sean McDonough (Play-by-play), Matt Millen (Color) & Samantha Steele (Sideline)

Statistics	OKST	TEX
First downs	21	24
Total yards	420	370
Rushing yards	231	202
Passing yards	139	218
Turnovers	1	3
Time of possession	20:42	39:18

Team	Category	Player	Statistics
Oklahoma State	Passing	Brandon Weeden	23/41, 218 yards, TD
Oklahoma State	Rushing	Jeremy Smith	7 rushes, 140 yards, 2 TD
Oklahoma State	Receiving	Justin Blackmon	7 receptions, 74 yards, TD
Texas	Passing	David Ash	22/40, 139 yards, 2 INT
Texas	Rushing	Malcolm Brown	19 rushes, 135 yards, 2 TD
Texas	Receiving	Mike Davis	10 receptions, 80 yards

=== at Missouri ===
No. 6 Oklahoma State at Missouri

Team	1	2	3	4	Total
• No. 6 Cowboys	14	10	14	7	45
Tigers	3	14	0	7	24

- Date: October 22
- Location: Faurot Field, Columbia, MO
- Game start: 11:00 a.m. CDT
- Elapsed time: 3:19
- Game attendance: 64,202
- Game weather: Clear and Sunny, 55 °F (13 °C), Wind: W 3 mph
- Referee: Randy Christal
- TV announcers (FX): Gus Johnson (Play-by-play), Charles Davis (Color) & Kristina Pink (Sideline)

Statistics	OKST	MIZ
First downs	27	26
Total yards	533	463
Rushing yards	195	248
Passing yards	338	215
Turnovers	1	4
Time of possession	28:14	31:46

Team	Category	Player	Statistics
Oklahoma State	Passing	Brandon Weeden	33/49, 338 yards, 3 TD, INT
Oklahoma State	Rushing	Joseph Randle	14 rushes, 138 yards, 3 TD
Oklahoma State	Receiving	Michael Harrison	3 receptions, 71 yards, TD
Missouri	Passing	James Franklin	14/27, 184 yards, TD, 3 INT
Missouri	Rushing	Henry Josey	25 rushes, 138 yards
Missouri	Receiving	T. J. Moe	6 receptions, 103 yards, TD

=== Baylor ===
Baylor at No. 3 Oklahoma State

Team	1	2	3	4	Total
Bears	0	0	3	21	24
• No. 3 Cowboys	21	14	14	10	59

- Date: October 29
- Location: Boone Pickens Stadium, Stillwater, OK
- Game start: 2:30 p.m. CDT
- Elapsed time: 3:27
- Game attendance: 58,274
- Game weather: Sunny, 65 °F (18 °C), Wind: SSW 18 mph
- Referee: Scott Novak
- TV announcers (ABC/ESPN): Bob Wischusen (Play-by-play), Bob Davie (Color) & Jeannine Edwards (Sideline)

Statistics	BAY	OKST
First downs	36	23
Total yards	622	601
Rushing yards	176	327
Passing yards	446	274
Turnovers	5	1
Time of possession	23:40	36:20

Team	Category	Player	Statistics
Baylor	Passing	Robert Griffin III	33/50, 425 yards, TD, 2 INT
Baylor	Rushing	Terrance Omar Ganaway	23 rushes, 88 yards, TD
Baylor	Receiving	Terrance Williams	8 receptions, 154 yards, TD
Oklahoma State	Passing	Brandon Weeden	24/36, 274 yards, 3 TD
Oklahoma State	Rushing	Joseph Randle	14 rushes, 152 yards, 4 TD
Oklahoma State	Receiving	Justin Blackmon	13 receptions, 172 yards, 2 TD

=== No. 17 Kansas State ===
No. 17 Kansas State at No. 3 Oklahoma State

Team	1	2	3	4	Total
No. 17 Wildcats	10	14	7	14	45
• No. 3 Cowboys	14	13	7	18	52

- Date: November 5
- Location: Boone Pickens Stadium, Stillwater, OK
- Game start: 7:00 p.m. CDT
- Elapsed time: 3:30
- Game attendance: 58,895
- Game weather: Cloudy, 58 °F (14 °C), Wind: SSE 18 mph
- Referee: Mike Defee
- TV announcers (ABC/ESPN2): Brent Musburger (Play-by-play), Kirk Herbstreit (Color) & Lisa Salters (Color)

Scoring summary
1	12:50	OSU	Joseph Randle 4-yard run (Quinn Sharp kick)	OSU 7–0
1	7:58	OSU	Justin Blackmon 11-yard pass from Brandon Weeden (Quinn Sharp kick)	OSU 14–0
1	3:39	KSU	Anthony Cantele 37-yard field goal	OSU 14–3
1	1:25	KSU	Angelo Pease 5-yard run (Anthony Cantele kick)	OSU 14–10
2	11:36	KSU	Collin Klein 4-yard run (Anthony Cantele kick)	KSU 17–14
2	10:46	KSU	Allen Chapman 60-yard interception return (Anthony Cantele kick)	KSU 24–14
2	7:50	OSU	Quinn Sharp 19-yard field goal	KSU 24–17
2	6:38	OSU	Tracey Moore 5-yard pass from Brandon Weeden (Quinn Sharp kick)	Tied 24–24
2	0:38	OSU	Quinn Sharp 29-yard field goal	OSU 27–24
3	10:24	OSU	Joseph Randle 15-yard pass from Brandon Weeden (Quinn Sharp kick)	OSU 34–24
3	5:48	KSU	Tyler Lockett 14-yard pass from Collin Klein (Anthony Cantele kick)	OSU 34–31
4	13:44	OSU	Quinn Sharp 40-yard field goal	OSU 37–31
4	5:16	KSU	Collin Klein 5-yard run (Anthony Cantele kick)	KSU 38–37
4	4:47	OSU	Justin Blackmon 54-yard pass from Brandon Weeden (Brandon Weeden to Justin Blackmon pass)	OSU 45–38
4	3:18	KSU	Collin Klein 12-yard run (Anthony Cantele kick)	KSU 45–45
4	2:16	OSU	Joseph Randle 23-yard run (Quinn Sharp kick)	OSU 52–45

Statistics	KSU	OKST
First downs	27	26
Total yards	507	575
Rushing yards	276	73
Passing yards	231	502
Turnovers	2	4
Time of possession	40:49	19:11

Team	Category	Player	Statistics
Kansas State	Passing	Collin Klein	22/38, 231 yards, TD, INT
Kansas State	Rushing	Collin Klein	29 rushes, 144 yards, 3 TD
Kansas State	Receiving	Tramaine Thompson	6 receptions, 71 yards
Oklahoma State	Passing	Brandon Weeden	36/46, 502 yards, 4 TD, 2 INT
Oklahoma State	Rushing	Joseph Randle	16 rushes, 73 yards, 2 TD
Oklahoma State	Receiving	Justin Blackmon	13 receptions, 205 yards, 2 TD

=== at Texas Tech ===
No. 2 Oklahoma State at Texas Tech

Team	1	2	3	4	Total
• No. 2 Cowboys	21	28	14	3	66
Red Raiders	0	0	6	0	6

- Date: November 12
- Location: Jones AT&T Stadium, Lubbock, TX
- Game start: 11:00 a.m. CST
- Elapsed time: 3:10
- Game attendance: 57,205
- Game weather: Partly Cloudy, 64 °F (18 °C), Wind: W 19 mph, G26
- Referee: Greg Burks
- TV announcers (ABC): Bob Wischusen (Play-by-play), Bob Davie (Color) & Shelley Smith (Sideline)

Statistics	OKST	TTU
First downs	31	16
Total yards	637	270
Rushing yards	183	101
Passing yards	454	169
Turnovers	2	3
Time of possession	32:47	27:13

Team	Category	Player	Statistics
Oklahoma State	Passing	Brandon Weeden	31/37, 423 yards, 5 TD
Oklahoma State	Rushing	Herschel Sims	13 rushes, 109 yards
Oklahoma State	Receiving	Josh Cooper	6 receptions, 106 yards
Texas Tech	Passing	Seth Doege	25/43, 169 yards, INT
Texas Tech	Rushing	DeAndré Washington	11 rushes, 47 yards
Texas Tech	Receiving	DeAndré Washington	4 receptions, 41 yards

=== at Iowa State ===
No. 2 Oklahoma State at Iowa State

Team	1	2	3	4	OT	2OT	Total
No. 2 Cowboys	7	10	7	0	7	0	31
• Cyclones	0	7	10	7	7	6	37

- Date: November 18
- Location: Jack Trice Stadium, Ames, IA
- Game start: 7:00 p.m. CST
- Elapsed time: 3:45
- Game attendance: 52,027
- Game weather: Clear Skies, 46 °F (8 °C), Wind: S 0–5 mph
- Referee: Reggie Smith
- TV announcers (ESPN): Joe Tessitore (Play-by-play), Rod Gilmore (Color) & Samantha Steele (Sideline)

Scoring summary
1	1:04	OSU	Shaun Lewis 70-yard interception return (Quinn Sharp kick)	OSU 7–0
2	10:43	OSU	Quinn Sharp 29-yard field goal	OSU 10–0
2	7:22	ISU	D. Reynolds 16-yard pass from Jared Barnett (Zach Guyer kick)	OSU 10–7
2	5:26	OSU	Justin Blackmon 27-yard pass from Brandon Weeden (Quinn Sharp kick)	OSU 17–7
3	12:33	OSU	Tracy Moore 30-yard pass from Brandon Weeden (Quinn Sharp kick)	OSU 24–7
3	10:05	ISU	James White 32-yard run (Zach Guyer kick)	OSU 24–14
3	4:04	ISU	Zach Guyer 24-yard field goal	OSU 24–17
4	5:30	ISU	Albert Gary 7-yard pass from Jared Barnett (Zach Guyer kick)	Tied 24–24
OT		ISU	James White 25-yard pass from Jared Barnett (Zach Guyer kick)	ISU 31–24
OT		OSU	Josh Cooper 6-yard pass from Brandon Weeden (Quinn Sharp kick)	Tied 31–31
2OT		ISU	Jeff Woody 4-yard run	ISU 37–31

Statistics	OKST	ISU
First downs	24	33
Total yards	536	568
Rushing yards	60	192
Passing yards	476	376
Turnovers	5	3
Time of possession	24:47	35:13

Team	Category	Player	Statistics
Oklahoma State	Passing	Brandon Weeden	42/58, 476 yards, 3 TD, 3 INT
Oklahoma State	Rushing	Joseph Randle	10 rushes, 49 yards
Oklahoma State	Receiving	Josh Cooper	13 receptions, 128 yards, TD
Iowa State	Passing	Jared Barnett	31/58, 376 yards, 3 TD, 2 INT
Iowa State	Rushing	Jared Barnett	14 rushes, 84 yards
Iowa State	Receiving	Albert Gary	7 receptions, 109 yards, TD

=== No. 10 Oklahoma ===
No. 10 Oklahoma at No. 3 Oklahoma State

Team	1	2	3	4	Total
No. 10 Sooners	0	3	0	7	10
• No. 3 Cowboys	10	14	20	0	44

- Date: December 3
- Location: Boone Pickens Stadium, Stillwater, OK
- Game start: 7:00 p.m. CST
- Elapsed time: 3:15
- Game attendance: 58,141
- Game weather: Overcast, 38 °F (3 °C), Wind: W 7 mph
- Referee: Scott Novak
- TV announcers (ABC): Brad Nessler (Play-by-play), Todd Blackledge (Color) & Holly Rowe (Sideline)

Scoring summary
1	8:36	OSU	Jeremy Smith 9-yard run (Quinn Sharp kick)	OSU 7–0
1	2:51	OSU	Quinn Sharp 25-yard field goal	OSU 10–0
2	4:39	OSU	Joseph Randle 1-yard run (Quinn Sharp kick)	OSU 17–0
2	1:05	OSU	Joseph Randle 2-yard run (Quinn Sharp kick)	OSU 24–0
2	0:00	OU	Mike Hunnicutt 48-yard field goal	OSU 24–3
3	12:02	OSU	Quinn Sharp 37-yard field goal	OSU 27–3
3	11:56	OSU	Richetti Jones 5-yard fumble return (Quinn Sharp kick)	OSU 34–3
3	5:23	OSU	Jeremy Smith 37-yard run (Quinn Sharp kick)	OSU 41–3
3	1:56	OSU	Quinn Sharp 34-yard field goal	OSU 44–3
4	2:25	OU	Blake Bell 28-yard run (Mike Hunnicutt kick)	OSU 44–10

Statistics	OKLA	OKST
First downs	24	22
Total yards	358	495
Rushing yards	108	278
Passing yards	250	217
Turnovers	5	1
Time of possession	31:07	28:53

Team	Category	Player	Statistics
Oklahoma	Passing	Landry Jones	27/50, 250 yards, 2 INT
Oklahoma	Rushing	Roy Finch	9 rushes, 65 yards
Oklahoma	Receiving	Kenny Stills	6 receptions, 63 yards
Oklahoma State	Passing	Brandon Weeden	24/36, 217 yards
Oklahoma State	Rushing	Joseph Randle	19 rushes, 151 yards, 2 TD
Oklahoma State	Receiving	Justin Blackmon	10 receptions, 95 yards

=== vs. No. 4 Stanford (Fiesta Bowl) ===
No. 4 Stanford vs. No. 3 Oklahoma State

Team	1	2	3	4	OT	Total
No. 4 Cardinal	7	14	7	10	0	38
• No. 3 Cowboys	0	21	3	14	3	41

- Date: January 2
- Location: University of Phoenix Stadium, Glendale, AZ
- Game start: 7:30 p.m. CDT
- Elapsed time: 3:37
- Game attendance: 69,927
- Game weather: Indoors
- Referee: Tom Ritter
- TV announcers (ESPN): Sean McDonough (Play-by-play), Matt Millen (Color) & Heather Cox (Sideline)

Scoring summary
1	4:16	STAN	Ty Montgomery 53-yard pass from Andrew Luck (Jordan Williamson kick)	STAN 7–0
2	10:21	STAN	Jeremy Stewart 24-yard run (Jordan Williamson kick)	STAN 14–0
2	8:50	OSU	Justin Blackmon 43-yard pass from Brandon Weeden (Quinn Sharp kick)	STAN 14–7
2	6:19	OSU	Justin Blackmon 67-yard pass from Brandon Weeden (Quinn Sharp kick)	Tied 14–14
2	2:25	STAN	Stepfan Taylor 4-yard run (Jordan Williamson kick)	STAN 21–14
2	0:27	OSU	Brandon Weeden 2-yard run (Quinn Sharp kick)	Tied 21–21
3	8:22	STAN	Zach Ertz 16-yard pass from Andrew Luck (Jordan Williamson kick)	STAN 28–21
3	5:21	OSU	Quinn Sharp 19-yard field goal	STAN 28–24
4	14:16	STAN	Jordan Williamson 30-yard field goal	STAN 31=24
4	11:53	OSU	Justin Blackmon 17-yard pass from Brandon Weeden (Quinn Sharp kick)	Tied 31–31
4	4:34	STAN	Stepfan Taylor 1-yard run (Jordan Williamson kick)	STAN 38–31
4	2:35	OSU	Joseph Randle 4-yard run (Quinn Sharp kick)	Tied 38–38
OT		OSU	Quinn Sharp 22-yard field goal	OSU 41–38

Statistics	STAN	OKST
First downs	27	15
Total yards	590	412
Rushing yards	243	13
Passing yards	347	399
Turnovers	2	1
Time of possession	41:47	18:13

Team	Category	Player	Statistics
Stanford	Passing	Andrew Luck	27/31, 347 yards, 2 TD, INT
Stanford	Rushing	Stepfan Taylor	35 rushes, 177 yards, 2 TD
Stanford	Receiving	Ty Montgomery	7 receptions, 120 yards, TD
Oklahoma State	Passing	Brandon Weeden	29/42, 399 yards, 3 TD, INT
Oklahoma State	Rushing	Joseph Randle	10 rushes, 23 yards, TD
Oklahoma State	Receiving	Justin Blackmon	8 receptions, 186 yards, 3 TD

== Awards and honors ==
- Justin Blackmon – Fred Biletnikoff Award, Unanimous First-team All-American
- Levy Adcock – Consensus First-team All-American

== 2012 NFL draft ==
Player	Position	Round	Pick	Franchise
Justin Blackmon	Wide receiver	1	5	Jacksonville Jaguars
Brandon Weeden	Quarterback	1	22	Cleveland Browns
Markelle Martin	Safety	6	190	Tennessee Titans
