= Paul Rhoads =

American football player and coach (born 1967)

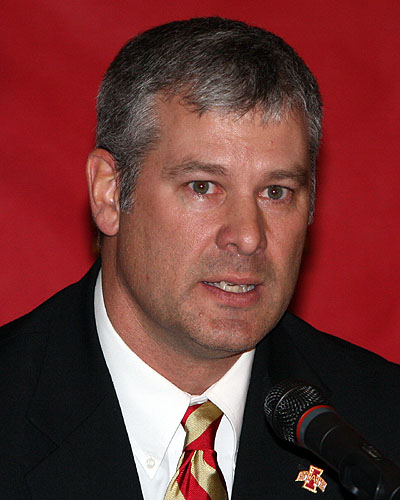

Current position
- Title: Senior Defensive Analyst
- Team: Mississippi State
- Conference: SEC

Biographical details
- Born: February 2, 1967 (age 59); Nevada, Iowa, U.S.

Playing career
- 1985–1988: Missouri Western
- Position: Defensive back

Coaching career (HC unless noted)
- 1989–1990: Utah State (GA)
- 1991: Ohio State (GA)
- 1992–1993: Pacific (CA) (DB)
- 1994: Pacific (CA) (PGC)
- 1995: Iowa State (ILB)
- 1996–1999: Iowa State (DB)
- 2000–2007: Pittsburgh (DC)
- 2008: Auburn (DC/DB)
- 2009–2015: Iowa State
- 2016: Arkansas (DB)
- 2017: Arkansas (DC/DB)
- 2018–2019: UCLA (DB)
- 2020: Arizona (DC)
- 2021: Ohio State (DA)
- 2022: Gulf Shores HS (AL) (DC)
- 2023: Boston College (OLB)
- 2024: Gulf Shores HS (AL) (DA)
- 2025–present: Mississippi State (DA)

Head coaching record
- Overall: 32–55
- Bowls: 1–2

Paul Robert Rhoads (born February 2, 1967) is an American football coach. He is a Defensive Analyst at Mississippi State University. A major conference assistant coach and head coach, he spent a seven-year tenure as head coach at Iowa State.

Rhoads played defensive back at Missouri Western State University.

== Playing career ==
Rhoads was a prep special mention all-state free safety and valedictorian of his high school class at Ankeny, Iowa before lettering for three-years at Missouri Western State University from 1986 to 1988, where he played defensive back alongside Leland Williams. He graduated in 1989 with a bachelor's degree in economics and was the recipient of the Chris Faros Scholarship, honoring the program's top senior student-athlete. Rhoads then earned a master's degree from Utah State University in 1991.

== Coaching career ==
Rhoads began his coaching career under Chuck Shelton as a graduate assistant at Utah State working with the secondary. After serving in the same capacity under John Cooper at Ohio State, Rhoads received his first full-time position as a defensive backs coach at University of the Pacific in 1992. The following season, the Pacific Tigers ranked 20th nationally in pass defense, allowing just 152 yards passing per game.

In 1995, incoming head coach Dan McCarney hired Rhoads to join him at Iowa State, where he served as linebackers and secondary coach for 5 seasons. While with the Cyclones, Rhoads also assisted with the special teams.

=== Pittsburgh ===
In 2000, Rhoads was hired as the defensive coordinator for the Pittsburgh Panthers by Walt Harris. In his first season, Rhoads was credited with improving the team's defense to their best performance since 1980. In 2001, his defensive unit ranked among the nation's top 30 in five different categories at season's end. Additionally, Pitt finished with 38 quarterback sacks. In 2002, the Panthers defense ranked among the nation's top 25 in an impressive seven different categories. In 2004, Pitt ranked ninth nationally with 17 interceptions and Rhoads was kept on staff by new head coach Dave Wannstedt. That decision proved wise as by then end of the 2005 season, Pitt was ranked second nationally in pass defense (yielding just 152.82 yards per game) and sixth in pass efficiency defense with a 99.36 rating. In 2006, Sporting News named Rhoads the Big East's best defensive coordinator. In 2007, Rhoads' defense was among the nation's leaders in various categories, finishing fifth nationally in total defense (allowing just 297.7 yards per games) and third nationally in pass defense (allowing just 167.3 yards per game). While the team finished 5–7, they ended on a high note by holding then-#2 ranked rival West Virginia to a season-low nine points in a 13–9 victory in the Backyard Brawl, limiting the Mountaineers high-powered offense to 183 yards (292 yards below their average).

=== Auburn ===
In 2002, coach Tommy Tuberville offered Rhoads a job to fill a vacant spot for defensive coordinator at Auburn. Having completed only his second season at Pitt, Rhoads passed on the job with Tuberville eventually hiring Gene Chizik. However, when Will Muschamp resigned at the conclusion of the 2007 season, coach Tuberville again offered the job with Rhoads accepting to head the 2008 Tigers defense on January 17, 2008. As head of Auburn's defense, Rhoads also coached defensive backs, as did the Tigers' last four defensive coordinators.

While the 2008 Auburn defense started exceptionally (ranking in the top25 nationally in 6 defensive categories after week 6, including the 2nd ranked scoring defense), the Tigers struggled down the stretch finishing 5–7. The highly touted defense fell to an overall defensive ranking of 27th out of 119 Division I FBS squads, but did finish 10th in yards per play and 15th in scoring.

=== Iowa State ===
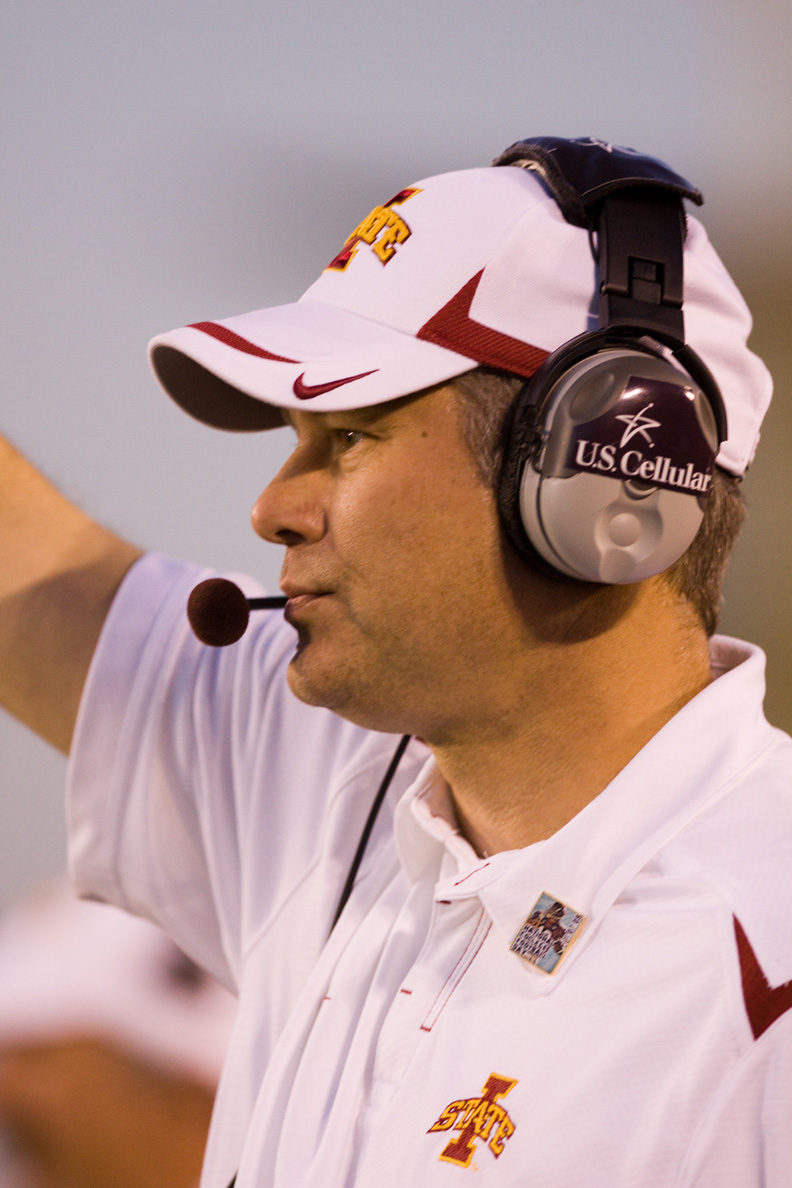
Rhoads as the head coach of Iowa State during a home game against Oklahoma State

Following the departure of Tommy Tuberville at Auburn, Gene Chizik (then head coach at Iowa State) returned to Auburn as head coach. Rhoads was not retained by Chizik and was instead chosen to replace him as head coach at Iowa State. Rhoads was introduced as the Cyclones' 31st head coach on December 20, 2008. Rhoads had previously spent time at Iowa State as an assistant coach in the late 1990s and was raised only 20 miles from the school's football facilities. His father Cecil was one of the winningest coaches in the state of Iowa's history, coaching high school for more than three decades, and was inducted into the Iowa High School Football Coaches Hall of Fame. Rhoads' contract was reported to be a five-year deal worth $5.75 million that included incentives that could increase total compensation. Rhoads opened his ISU career with a win over FCS North Dakota State. He also led Iowa State to a victory at Kent State in his first year, ending a 17-game road losing streak. On October 17, 2009, Rhoads and the Cyclones defeated Baylor to end an 11-game losing stretch against conference opponents. On October 24, 2009, the Cyclones defeated Nebraska on the road for the first time since 1977, inciting his post game speech which became nationally recognized. Paul Rhoads is the first Iowa State coach to win six games in his initial season since 1915, when Charles Mayser coached the Cyclones to a 6–2–1 record.

On December 31, 2009, Rhoads and the Cyclones capped off their season with an Insight Bowl victory over Minnesota.

In 2010, Rhoads captured a milestone win over #22 Texas by a 28–21 margin. It was only the fourth ever road win over a ranked team in Iowa State history, and the first occurrence since a 33–31 victory over Oklahoma in 1990. It was also the first ever win by an Iowa State football team over Texas.

In 2011, Iowa State started off the season 3–0 including a triple overtime win over Iowa in Ames, and a win over Connecticut in East Hartford. The Cyclones would drop the next four games, starting out 0–4 in conference play but quickly bounced back. The Cyclones rebounded with a 41–7 win on October 29 at No. 19 Texas Tech. In the process of that game, Iowa State managed to rack up 512 total yards, the most since the November 22, 2008, game at Kansas State (626 yards at KSU). Several other school records were broken, including first-ever win in Lubbock, Texas (1–5 all-time), largest margin of victory against a ranked opponent (previous: 22-point margin of victory against No. 20 Nebraska, 2002), largest margin of victory against a ranked opponent as an unranked team (previous: 21-point margin of victory against No. 8 Missouri, 1981), largest margin of victory against a ranked opponent on the road (previous: 7-point margin of victory at No. 22 Texas, 2010), and most points scored against a ranked opponent since November 9, 1996 (42 at No. 7 Colorado).

On November 18, Iowa State faced off against undefeated No. 2 Oklahoma State, Brandon Weeden, and star wide receiver Justin Blackmon in Ames. Down 24–7 early in the second half, Iowa State scored 17 unanswered points to force overtime. In overtime, Iowa State scored on its first play from scrimmage, but Oklahoma State answered back with a touchdown. In the second overtime, Iowa State forced an interception and ran three run plays to beat Oklahoma State 37–31, taking away Oklahoma State's chances of playing for a national championship. Iowa State became bowl eligible with the win and improved to 6–4. The win over Oklahoma State marks Iowa State's first ever win against an opponent in the top 6. (AP polls). On December 16, 2011, the school announced a 10-year contract worth $20 million.

While Rhoads was able to lead the 2012 team to the Liberty Bowl, where the Cyclones lost 31–17 to Tulsa to cap a 6–7 season, his 2013, 2014 and 2015 teams were unable to recapture the success of his earlier teams, winning just four Big 12 games (including a winless conference record in 2014) and going 8–27 overall. The 2015 season proved to be particularly difficult, as in two games, the Cyclones held double-digit halftime leads against both Oklahoma State and Kansas State only to lose late in the fourth quarter. Following a 38–35 loss to Kansas State on November 21, in which he came under heavy criticism for play-calling in the game's final 90 seconds, Rhoads was fired as head coach, effective the conclusion of the season.

=== Arkansas ===
On February 24, 2016, Arkansas announced that Rhoads would be joining its coaching staff as a defensive backs coach, replacing Clay Jennings, who left Arkansas for the Texas Longhorns.

On January 16, 2017, Rhoads was promoted to defensive coordinator. On November 24, 2017, interim athletic director Julie Cromer Peoples announced that Rhoads would serve as the interim head coach for the Arkansas Razorbacks after the former coach, Bret Bielema, was fired following a 48–45 loss to the Missouri Tigers.

=== UCLA ===
In December 2017, he was hired by the UCLA Bruins to become their defensive backs coach. In Rhoads' first season at UCLA, the Bruins defense improved statistically in several categories including average gain per rush allowed, total offense yards allowed per game, turnovers forced and points per game allowed.

=== Arizona ===
On December 20, 2019, he was hired by Kevin Sumlin to become the defensive coordinator for the Arizona Wildcats. After Sumlin was fired in December 2020, Rhoads was named Arizona's interim head coach.

=== Ohio State ===
In February 2021, Ohio State announced Rhoads was joining the Buckeye program as a defensive analyst.

=== Gulf Shores HS ===
Before the 2022 season, it was announced that Rhoads would become the defensive coordinator of Gulf Shores High School in Gulf Shores, Alabama.

=== Boston College ===
Before the 2023 season, Jeff Hafley hired Rhoads to his staff as an outside linebackers coach.

== Personal ==
Rhoads' father, Cecil, was a high school coach for over three decades and was inducted into the Iowa High School Football Coaches Hall of Fame. His wife, Vickie, was a basketball player at Missouri Western and his two sons, Jake and Wyatt, played football for Iowa State.

== Head coaching record ==
Year	Team	Overall	Conference	Standing	Bowl/playoffs
Iowa State Cyclones (Big 12 Conference) (2009–2015)
2009	Iowa State	7–6	3–5	4th (North)	W Insight
2010	Iowa State	5–7	3–5	T–3rd (North)	
2011	Iowa State	6–7	3–6	8th	L Pinstripe
2012	Iowa State	6–7	3–6	9th	L Liberty
2013	Iowa State	3–9	2–7	T–7th	
2014	Iowa State	2–10	0–9	10th	
2015	Iowa State	3–9	2–7	9th	
Iowa State:		32–55	16–45		
Total:		32–55			
