= 2011 Oklahoma State vs. Iowa State football game =

- Conference game
Oklahoma State Cowboys	Iowa State Cyclones
(10–0)	(5–4)
31	37
Head coach: Mike Gundy	Head coach: Paul Rhoads
AP / Coaches / BCS; 2 / 2 / 2	AP / Coaches / BCS; NR / NR / NR
	1	2	3	4	OT	2OT	Total
Oklahoma State	7	10	7	0	7	0	31
Iowa State	0	7	10	7	7	6	37
- Date: November 18, 2011
- Season: 2011
- Stadium: Jack Trice Stadium
- Location: Ames, Iowa
- Favorite: Oklahoma State by 27
- Referee: Reggie Smith
- Attendance: 52,027

United States TV coverage
- Network: ESPN
- Announcers: Joe Tessitore, Rod Gilmore, and Samantha Steele

The 2011 Oklahoma State vs. Iowa State football game, played November 18, 2011, was an NCAA college football game held between the Oklahoma State Cowboys and the Iowa State Cyclones at Jack Trice Stadium, the home stadium of Iowa State. The game had major implications, as Oklahoma State controlled its destiny for playing in the BCS National Championship Game. In a remarkable upset, Iowa State won in double overtime, 37–31.

== Pregame ==
Oklahoma State entered the game ranked #2 in the BCS and all major polls. Their dynamic air raid attack spearheaded them to a 10–0 record, the best undefeated start in school history. They came into the game averaging 51.7 points per game. The Cowboys had vaulted to #2 after #1 LSU defeated previous #2 Alabama a week earlier, and it was understood that the Cowboys would play in the BCS national championship game if they won out.

The day before the game, a tragic plane crash occurred that killed Oklahoma State women's basketball coach Kurt Budke and his assistant Miranda Serna. The crash was said to have a huge psychological impact on the normally potent Cowboys squad. Mike Gundy stated about the crash, "Honestly, the last thing that anybody wants to do, really, is play a game".

ESPN's Joe Tessitore said before the game during their broadcast, "The Oklahoma State Cowboys have arrived in Ames, Iowa, with heavy hearts. These coaches and players are dealing with tragic news. Women's basketball head coach Kurt Budke and assistant coach Miranda Serna were killed in a plane crash last night. In moments, another kickoff arrives before this undefeated team while an entire university community is overcome with grief." Before the game, Jack Trice Stadium observed a brief moment of silence for the lives lost in the plane crash.

== The game ==
The Cowboys raced to a 24–7 lead early into the third quarter. Iowa State scored 17 straight points to tie the game, but quarterback Jared Barnett was intercepted with 2 minutes to go, and the Cowboys were immediately in field goal range. After the Cyclones forced a 4th-and-1 at the 20-yard line, Oklahoma State opted to try a field goal with just over a minute remaining, but the 37-yard field goal attempt by Oklahoma State kicker Quinn Sharp went wide right, forcing overtime. There, Iowa State scored a touchdown on the first play, while Oklahoma State successfully responded with a touchdown on their own. On the first play of the second overtime, a pass by Heisman candidate Brandon Weeden was tipped and intercepted by Ter'Ran Benton, giving Iowa State a golden opportunity to pull off the upset, which they did after a series of plays that culminated in running back Jeff Woody running into the endzone. Jubilant Iowa State fans then stormed the field.

Oklahoma State racked up 536 yards of total offense, but only gained 60 rushing yards and also committed five turnovers. It was Iowa State's first win over a team ranked sixth or higher in the AP poll.

== Aftermath and impact ==
The game had considerable impact on the history of college football. With Oklahoma State's loss, Alabama jumped back to second in the BCS standings, and remained there for the remainder of the season. Despite Oklahoma State throttling rival No. 13 Oklahoma 44–10 in the final game of the regular season, it was not enough to vault the Cowboys ahead of Alabama in the BCS standings, and Alabama was given the berth in the BCS National Championship Game against LSU. Despite Oklahoma State finishing ahead of Alabama in the computer polls that was one-third of the BCS formula, Alabama's lead in the human polls was too large to overcome. That created the slimmest margin between two teams in the final BCS Standings. Alabama had an average score of .9419. Oklahoma State had an average score of .9333. More controversy came from the BCS formula: Several head football coaches used their vote in the Coaches Poll to diminish OSU's position by voting them No. 4 or lower; among those to do so were Alabama head coach Nick Saban, former Missouri head coach Gary Pinkel, Air Force head coach Troy Calhoun, and Stanford head coach David Shaw. Alabama won the National Championship rematch with LSU, 21–0, while Oklahoma State was selected to play in the Fiesta Bowl against #4 Stanford, which Oklahoma State won 41–38 in overtime. One day after the rematch, the Sporting News reported that the 2012 offseason would be spent building a playoff system. The rematch is cited by some as the catalyst for the movement towards the new College Football Playoff system for determining a consensus national champion in NCAA Division I FBS football, and the catalyst that marked the downfall of Les Miles at LSU. Thus, some has marked this upset as the event that led to Miles' downfall.

Citing the plane crash and the subsequent loss, Weeden called it "one of the hardest days in Oklahoma State history."

4 years later, Oklahoma State found themselves in a similar situation. They were 9–0 and ranked #8, just 3 wins away from making the College Football Playoff, and were playing on the road against Iowa State. This time, the Cowboys prevailed, coincidentally coming back from a 24–7 deficit to win 35–31. However, the Cowboys would lose their final 2 regular season games, and as a result did not make the College Football Playoff.
