= 2011 Iowa State Cyclones football team =

American college football season

2011 Iowa State Cyclones football

Pinstripe Bowl, L 13–27 vs. Rutgers
- Conference: Big 12 Conference
- Record: 6–7 (3–6 Big 12)
- Head coach: Paul Rhoads (3rd season)
- Offensive coordinator: Tom Herman (3rd season)
- Offensive scheme: Spread
- Defensive coordinator: Wally Burnham (3rd season)
- Base defense: 4–3
- Home stadium: Jack Trice Stadium

2011 Big 12 Conference football standings
	Conf.			Overall
Team	W		L	W		L
No. 3 Oklahoma State $	8	–	1	12	–	1
No. 15 Kansas State	7	–	2	10	–	3
No. 13 Baylor	6	–	3	10	–	3
No. 16 Oklahoma	6	–	3	10	–	3
Missouri	5	–	4	8	–	5
Texas	4	–	5	8	–	5
Texas A&M	4	–	5	7	–	6
Iowa State	3	–	6	6	–	7
Texas Tech	2	–	7	5	–	7
Kansas	0	–	9	2	–	10
$ – BCS representative as conference champion; Rankings from AP Poll

The 2011 Iowa State Cyclones football team represented Iowa State University as a member of Big 12 Conference during the 2011 NCAA Division I FBS football season. Led by third-year head coach Paul Rhoads, the Cyclones compiled an overall record of 6–7 with a mark of 3–6 in conference play, placing eighth in the Big 12. Iowa State was invited to the Pinstripe Bowl, where the Cyclones lost to Rutgers. The team played home games at Jack Trice Stadium in Ames, Iowa.

On November 18, Iowa State upset No. 2 Oklahoma State, in a double-overtime thriller, knocking the Cowboys out of the BCS National Championship Game.

== Schedule ==
Date	Time	Opponent	Site	TV	Result	Attendance	Source
September 3	6:00 p.m.	No. 7 (FCS) Northern Iowa*	Jack Trice Stadium; Ames, IA	CYtv	W 20–19	54,672	
September 10	11:00 a.m.	Iowa*	Jack Trice Stadium; Ames, IA (rivalry)	FSN	W 44–41 ^{3OT}	56,085	
September 16	7:00 p.m.	at Connecticut*	Rentschler Field; East Hartford, CT	ESPN2	W 24–20	37,195	
October 1	6:00 p.m.	No. 17 Texas	Jack Trice Stadium; Ames, IA	Fox	L 14–37	56,390	
October 8	6:00 p.m.	at No. 25 Baylor	Floyd Casey Stadium; Waco, TX	FSN	L 26–49	35,625	
October 15	1:00 p.m.	at Missouri	Faurot Field; Columbia, MO (rivalry)	CYtv	L 17–52	71,004	
October 22	2:30 p.m.	No. 17 Texas A&M^{†}	Jack Trice Stadium; Ames, IA	ABC	L 17–33	51,131	
October 29	6:00 p.m.	at No. 22 Texas Tech	Jones AT&T Stadium; Lubbock, TX	FSN	W 41–7	59,260	
November 5	11:30 a.m.	Kansas	Jack Trice Stadium; Ames, IA	FCS Central	W 13–10	51,575	
November 18	7:00 p.m.	No. 2 Oklahoma State	Jack Trice Stadium; Ames, IA	ESPN	W 37–31 ^{2OT}	52,027	
November 26	11:00 a.m.	at No. 12 Oklahoma	Gaylord Family Oklahoma Memorial Stadium; Norman, OK	FX	L 6–26	84,326	
December 3	11:30 a.m.	at No. 16 Kansas State	Bill Snyder Family Football Stadium; Manhattan, KS (rivalry)	FSN	L 23–30	47,392	
December 30	2:20 p.m.	vs. Rutgers*	Yankee Stadium; Bronx, NY (Pinstripe Bowl)	ESPN	L 13–27	38,328	
*Non-conference game; ^{†}Homecoming; Rankings from AP Poll released prior to the game; All times are in Central time; Source:

== Game summaries ==
=== Game 1: vs. Northern Iowa Panthers ===
Game One: Northern Iowa Panthers at Iowa State Cyclones – Game summary

Quarter	1	2	3	4	Total
Panthers	3	3	7	6	19
Cyclones	0	7	0	13	20

at Jack Trice Stadium, Ames, IA

- Date: September 3
- Game time: 6:00 p.m. CDT
- Game weather: Temperature: 71°F • Wind: W 5–10 • Weather: humid, scat. showers
- Game attendance: 54,672
- Referee: Referee: Greg Burks • Umpire: Scott Campbell • Linesman: George Gusman • Line judge: Doug Moore • Back judge: Brian Ernest • Field judge: Nick Lave • Side judge: Gene Semko • Scorer: Shuey/Pope
- TV announcers (CYtv): John Walters (Play-by-play), Eric Heft (Color) & Ben Bruns (Sideline)

Game information

First quarter

- UNI – 09:00 Tyler Sievertsen 42 yd field goal (UNI 3–0)

Second quarter

- UNI – 08:55 Tyler Sievertsen 24 yd field goal (UNI 6–0)
- ISU – 00:00 Steele Jantz 1 yd run, Zach Guyer XP good (ISU 7–6)

Third quarter

- UNI – 02:30 David Johnson 1 yd run, Tyler Sievertsen XP good (UNI 13–7)

Fourth quarter

- ISU – 04:30 Josh Lenz 27 yd pass from Steele Jantz, Zach Guyer XP good (ISU 14–13)
- UNI – 04:17 David Johnson 80 yd pass from Tirrell Rennie, Tirrell Rennie pass failed (UNI 19–14)
- ISU – 00:40 Steele Jantz 1 yd run, Steele Jantz pass intercepted (ISU 20–19)

Top passers

- UNI – Tirrell Rennie 15/32, 181 yards, 1 TD
- ISU – Steele Jantz 18/40, 187 yards, 1 TD, 3 INT's

Top rushers

- UNI – Tirrell Rennie 18 attempts, 127 yards
- ISU – Steele Jantz 20 attempts, 80 yards

Top receivers

- UNI – David Johnson 2 receptions, 83 yards, 1 TD
- ISU – Aaron Horne 7 receptions, 69 yards

Top tacklers

- UNI – L.J. Fort 13 tackles
- ISU – Jake Knott 15 tackles

=== Game 2: vs. Iowa Hawkeyes ===
Game Two: Iowa Hawkeyes at Iowa State Cyclones – Game summary

Quarter	1	2	3	4	OT	2OT	3OT	Total
Hawkeyes	7	3	6	8	7	7	3	41
Cyclones	0	10	7	7	7	7	6	44

at Jack Trice Stadium, Ames, IA

- Date: September 10
- Game time: 11:11 a.m. CDT
- Game weather: Temperature: 75°F • Wind: N 5–10 • Weather: Mostly Clear
- Game attendance: 56,085
- Referee: Referee: John O'Neill • Umpire: Mike Pilarski • Linesman: Tripp Sutter • Line judge: Jack Teitz • Back judge: Jack Lyman • Field judge: Bob McElwee • Side judge: John Hayes • Scorer: Shuey/Pope
- TV announcers (FSN): Joel Meyers (play-by-play), Joel Klatt (color), Jim Knox (sideline)

Game information

First quarter

- IOWA – 05:20 Kevonte Martin-Manley 6 yd pass from James Vandenberg, Mike Meyer XP good (IOWA 7–0)

Second quarter

- IOWA – 13:32 Mike Meyer 42 yd field goal (IOWA 10–0)
- ISU – 07:40 Darius Reynolds 11 yd pass from Steele Jantz, Zach Guyer XP good (IOWA 10–7)
- ISU – 00:41 Grant Mahoney 54 yd field goal (Tied 10–10)

Third quarter

- IOWA – 09:27 Mike Meyer 20 yd field goal (IOWA 13–10)
- IOWA – 03:58 Mike Meyer 50 yd field goal (IOWA 16–10)
- ISU – 02:30 Josh Lenz 8 yd pass from Steele Jantz, Zach Guyer XP good (ISU 17–16)

Fourth quarter

- IOWA – 05:50 Marcus Coker 1 yd run, Keenan Davis pass from James Vandenberg (IOWA 24–17)
- ISU – 01:17 Darius Darks 4 yd pass from Steele Jantz, Zach Guyer XP good (Tied 24–24)

OT

- IOWA – 15:00 Marcus Coker 4 yd run, Mike Meyer XP good (IOWA 31–24)
- ISU – 15:00 Darius Reynolds 4 yd pass from Steele Jantz, Zach Guyer XP good (Tied 31–31)
- ISU – 15:00 James White 1 yd run, Zach Guyer XP good (ISU 38–31)
- IOWA – 15:00 Keenan Davis 23 yd pass from James Vandenberg, Mike Meyer XP good (Tied 38–38)
- IOWA – 15:00 Mike Meyer 34 yd field goal (IOWA 41–38)
- ISU – 15:00 James White 4 yd run (ISU 44–41)

Top passers

- IOWA – James Vandenberg 16/28, 207 yards, 2 TD
- ISU – Steele Jantz 25/37, 279 yards, 4 TD

Top rushers

- IOWA – Marcus Coker 35 attempts, 143 yards, 2 TD
- ISU – Shontrelle Johnson 18 attempts, 109 yards

Top receivers

- IOWA – Keenan Davis 5 receptions, 95 yards, 1 TD
- ISU – Darius Reynolds 6 receptions, 85 yards, 2 TD

Top tacklers

- IOWA – Christian Kirksey 13 tackles
- ISU – Matt Tau'fo'ou 8 tackles

=== Game 3: at Connecticut Huskies ===
Game Three: Iowa State Cyclones at Connecticut Huskies – Game summary

Quarter	1	2	3	4	Total
Cyclones	0	7	10	7	24
Huskies	10	0	3	7	20

at Rentschler Field, East Hartford, Connecticut

- Date: September 16
- Game time: 7:06 p.m. CDT
- Game weather: Temperature: 60°F • Wind: WNW 6 • Weather: Cloudy and crisp
- Game attendance: 37,195
- Referee: Referee: Tom Walker • Umpire: John Mascarello • Linesman: Chad Green • Line judge: David Oliver • Back judge: Brad Van Vark • Field judge: Scott Gaines • Side judge: Mike Contreraz • Scorer: Andy Prince
- TV announcers (ESPN2): Mike Gleason (play-by-play), John Congemi (color)

Game information

First quarter

- UCONN – 10:25 Scott McCummings 10 yd run, David Teggart XP good (UCONN 7–0)
- UCONN – 01:59 David Teggart 52 yd field goal (UCONN 10–0)

Second quarter

- ISU – 11:03 James White 26 yd run, Zach Guyer XP good (UCONN 10–7)

Third quarter

- ISU – 11:18 Darius Reynolds 40 yd pass from Josh Lenz, Zach Guyer XP good (ISU 14–10)
- UCONN – 09:37 David Teggart 50 yd field goal (ISU 14–13)
- ISU – 06:44 Zach Guyer 36 yd field goal (ISU 17–13)

Fourth quarter

- UCONN – Kashif Moore 39 yd pass from Scott McCummings, David Teggart XP good (UCONN 20–17)
- ISU – 09:08 Darius Reynolds 20 yd pass from Steele Jantz, Zach Guyer XP good (ISU 24–20)

Top passers

- ISU – Steele Jantz 18/29, 200 yards, 1 TD, 3 INT
- UCONN – Johnny McEntee 13/30, 188 yards, 1 INT

Top rushers

- ISU – Shontrelle Johnson 14 attempts, 65 yards
- UCONN – Lyle McCombs 18 attempts, 46 yards

Top receivers

- ISU – Darius Reynolds 4 receptions, 128 yards, 2 TD
- UCONN – Isiah Moore 8 receptions, 143 yards

Top tacklers

- ISU – Jake Knott 11 tackles
- UCONN – Jory Johnson 10 tackles

=== Game 4: vs. Texas Longhorns ===
Game Four: Texas Longhorns at Iowa State Cyclones – Game summary

Quarter	1	2	3	4	Total
Longhorns	13	21	0	3	37
Cyclones	0	0	0	14	14

at Jack Trice Stadium, Ames, IA

- Date: October 1
- Game time: 6:12 p.m. CDT
- Game weather: Temperature: 66°F • Wind: SE 0–5 • Weather: Clear skies
- Game attendance: 56,390
- Referee: Referee: Rick Loumiet • Umpire: Frank Villar • Linesman: Cal McNeill • Line judge: Mickey Bryson • Back judge: Donnie Aultman • Field judge: Reggie Smith • Side judge: Gene Semko • Scorer: Shuey/Pope
- TV announcers (FX): Gus Johnson (Play-by-play), Charles Davis (Color) & Tim Brewster (Sideline)

Game information

First quarter

- UT – 07:30 Justin Tucker 33 yd field goal (UT 10–0)
- UT – 05:35 Fozzie Whittaker 16 yd run, Justin Tucker XP good (UT 10–0)
- UT – 03:23 Justin Tucker 35 yd field goal (UT 13–0)

Second quarter

- UT – 10:18 Mike Davis 48 yd pass from David Ash, Justin Tucker XP good (UT 20–0)
- UT – 04:30 Josh Turner 34 yd blocked punt return, Justin Tucker XP good (UT 27–0)
- UT – 01:17 Jaxon Shipley 40 yd pass from David Ash, Justin Tucker XP good (UT 34–0)

Third quarter
Fourth quarter

- ISU – 11:33 James White 2 yd run, Zach Guyer XP good (UT 34–7)
- UT – 06:31 Justin Tucker 29 yd field goal (UT 37–7)
- ISU – 03:50 Chris Young 18 yd pass from Steele Jantz, Zach Guyer XP good (UT 37–14)

Top passers

- UT – David Ash 8/13, 156 yards, 2 TD
- ISU – Steele Jantz 28/51, 251 yards, 1 TD, 1 INT

Top rushers

- UT – Malcom Brown 15 attempts, 63 yards
- ISU – James White 11 attempts, 64 yards, 1 TD

Top receivers

- UT – Jaxon Shipley 6 receptions, 141 yards, 1 TD
- ISU – Darius Reynolds 6 receptions, 70 yards

Top tacklers

- UT – Blake Gideon 8 tackles
- ISU – Jake Knott 8 tackles

=== Game 5: at Baylor Bears ===
Game Five: Iowa State Cyclones at Baylor Bears – Game summary

Quarter	1	2	3	4	Total
Cyclones	7	7	6	6	26
Bears	0	21	14	14	49

at Floyd Casey Stadium, Waco, TX

- Date: October 8
- Game time: 6:10 p.m. CDT
- Game weather: Temperature: 87°F • Wind: SE 19 mph • Weather: Partly Cloudy
- Game attendance: 35,625
- Referee: Referee: Matt Leoffler • Umpire: Jim Adams • Linesman: Bill Scott • Line judge: Keith Garmond • Back judge: Terry White • Field judge: Randy Smith • Side judge: Anthony Fleming • Scorer: Richard Fogleman
- TV announcers (FSN): Bill Land (Play-by-play), Dave Lapham (Color) & Emily Jones (Sideline)

Game information

First quarter

- ISU – 11:13 Darius Reynolds 10 yd pass from Steele Jantz, Grant Mahoney XP good (ISU 7–0)

Second quarter

- BAY – 13:22 Robert Griffin III 1 yd run, Aaron Jones XP good (Tied 7–7)
- ISU – 10:19 Reid Branderhorst 1 yd pass from Steele Jantz, Grant Mahoney XP good (ISU 14–7)
- BAY – 07:31 Kendall Wright 15 yd pass from Robert Griffith III, Aaron Jones XP good (Tied 14–14)
- BAY – 04:30 Glasco Martin 1 yd run, Aaron Jones XP good (BAY 21–14)

Third quarter

- BAY – 08:08 Terrance Ganaway 3 yd run, Aaron Jones XP good (BAY 28–14)
- BAY – 06:18 Tevin Elliot 86 yd fumble recovery, Aaron Jones XP good (BAY 35–14)
- ISU – 05:32 James White 76 yd run, Grant Mahoney XP no good (BAY 35–20)

Fourth quarter

- BAY – 12:26 Terrance Ganaway 2 yd run, Aaron Jones XP good (BAY 42–20)
- ISU – 08:08 Darius Reynolds 28 yd pass from Steele Jantz, Grant Mahoney XP no good(BAY 42–26)
- BAY – 04:19 Terrance Ganaway 22 yd run, Aaron Jones XP good (BAY 49–26)

Top passers

- ISU – Steele Jantz 17/35, 244 yards, 3 TD, 1 INT
- BAY – Robert Griffith III 22/30, 212 yards, 1 TD

Top rushers

- ISU – James White 16 attempts, 148 yards, 1 TD
- BAY – Terrance Ganaway 23 attempts, 200 yards, 3 TD

Top receivers

- ISU – Darius Reynolds 7 receptions, 178 yards, 2 TD
- BAY – Kendall Wright 8 receptions, 69 yards, 1 TD

Top tacklers

- ISU – Jake Knott 18 tackles
- BAY – Sam Holl 11 tackles

=== Game 6: at Missouri Tigers ===
Game Six: Iowa State Cyclones at Missouri Tigers – Game summary

Quarter	1	2	3	4	Total
Cyclones	3	7	0	7	17
Tigers	21	10	14	7	52

at Faurot Field, Columbia, MO

- Date: October 15
- Game time: 1:07 p.m. CDT
- Game weather: Temperature: 66°F • Wind: SE 0–5 • Weather: Clear skies
- Game attendance: 71,004
- Referee: Referee: Greg Burks • Umpire: Scott Campbell • Linesman: George Gusman • Line judge: Kevin Mar • Back judge: Brian Ernest • Field judge: Nick Lave • Side judge: Gene Semko • Scorer: Tim Knarr
- TV announcers (CYtv): John Walters (Play-by-play), Eric Heft (Color) & Ben Bruns (Sideline)

Game information

First quarter

- MU – 12:03 James Franklin 1 yd run, Grant Ressel XP good (MU 7–0)
- MU – 09:05 Henry Josey 1 yd run, Grant Ressel XP good (MU 14–0)
- ISU – 04:35 Zach Guyer 26 yd field goal (MU 14–3)
- MU – 01:33 Michael Egnew 39 yd pass from James Franklin, Grant Ressel XP good (MU 21–3)

Second quarter

- MU – 11:29 Kendial Lawrence 2 yd run, Grant Ressel XP good (MU 28–3)
- ISU – 10:07 A.J. Klein 78 yd interception return, Zach Guyer XP good (28–10)
- MU – 00:00 Grant Ressel 23 yd field goal (MU 31–10)

Third quarter

- MU – 09:07 T.J. Moe 7 yd pass from James Franklin, Grant Ressel XP good (MU 38–10)
- MU – 05:01 James Franklin 1 yd run, Grant Ressel XP good (MU 45–10)

Fourth quarter

- MU – 14:43 Wes Kemp 6 yd pass from James Franklin, Grant Ressel XP good (MU 52–10)
- ISU – 12:41 Jeff Woody 13 yd run, Zach Guyer XP good (ISU 52–17)

Top passers

- ISU – Steele Jantz 17/32, 161 yards
- MU – James Franklin 20/28, 289 yards, 3 TD, 2 INT

Top rushers

- ISU – James White 14 attempts, 61 yards
- MU – Henry Josey 19 attempts, 129 yards, 1 TD

Top receivers

- ISU – Darius Darks 2 receptions, 45 yards
- MU – Michael Egnew 6 receptions, 105 yards, 1 TD

Top tacklers

- ISU – A.J. Klein 12 tackles
- MU – Andrew Wilson 10 tackles

=== Game 7: vs. Texas A&M Aggies ===
Game Seven: Texas A&M Aggies at Iowa State Cyclones – Game summary

Quarter	1	2	3	4	Total
Aggies	3	17	10	3	33
Cyclones	7	0	10	0	17

at Jack Trice Stadium, Ames, IA

- Date: October 22
- Game time: 2:36 p.m. CDT
- Game weather: Temperature: 66°F • Wind: NW 5–10 • Weather: Partly Cloudy
- Game attendance: 51,131
- Referee: Referee: Dan Romeo • Umpire: Scott Teifer • Linesman: Pete Gautreau • Line judge: Marc Bovos • Back judge: Dax Hill • Field judge: Bobby Bernard • Side judge: Ed Vinzant • Scorer: Shuey/Pope
- TV announcers (ABC): Mark Neely (Play-by-play) & Ray Bentley (Color)

Game information

First quarter

- TAMU – 13:00 Randy Bullock 25 yd field goal (TAMU 3–0)
- ISU – 03:29 James White 19 yd run, Zach Guyer XP good (ISU 7–3)

Second quarter

- TAMU – 09:19 Randy Bullock 47 yd field goal (ISU 7–6)
- TAMU – 04:08 Jeff Fuller 47 yd pass from Ryan Tannehill, Randy Bullock XP good (TAMU 13–7)
- TAMU – 00:42 Michael Lamothe 18 yd pass from Ryan Tannehill, Randy Bullock XP good (TAMU 20–7)

Third quarter

- TAMU – 12:45 Randy Bullock 47 yd field goal (TAMU 23–7)
- TAMU – 09:39 Christine Michael 9 yd run, Randy Bullock XP good (TAMU 30–7)
- ISU – 06:50 Duran Hollis 1 yd run, Zach Guyer XP good (TAMU 30–14)
- ISU – 02:16 Zach Guyer 43 yd field goal (TAMU 30–17)

Fourth quarter

- TAMU – 07:30 Randy Bullock 20 yd field goal (TAMU 33–17)

Top passers

- TAMU – Ryan Tannehill 23/43, 263 yards, 2 TD
- ISU – Jared Barnett 16/36, 180 yards

Top rushers

- TAMU – Christine Michael 18 attempts, 142 yards, 1 TD
- ISU – Jared Barnett 13 attempts, 66 yards

Top receivers

- TAMU – Jeff Fuller 7 receptions, 75 yards, 1 TD
- ISU – Josh Lenz 8 receptions, 117 yards

Top tacklers

- TAMU – Sean Porter 8 tackles
- ISU – Jeremey Reeves 10 tackles

=== Game 8: at Texas Tech Red Raiders ===
Game Eight: Iowa State Cyclones at Texas Tech Red Raiders – Game summary

Quarter	1	2	3	4	Total
Cyclones	21	3	7	10	41
Red Raiders	0	7	0	0	7

at Jones AT&T Stadium, Lubbock, TX

- Date: October 29
- Game time: 6:10 p.m. CDT
- Game weather: Temperature: 64°F • Wind: SW 19 G26 • Weather: Partly Cloudy
- Game attendance: 59,260
- Referee: Referee: Randy Christal • Umpire: John Mascarello • Linesman: Cal McNeill • Line judge: Kelly Deterding • Back judge: Terry Jones • Field judge: Joe Blubaugh • Side judge: Tom Bessant
- TV announcers (FSN): Bill Land (Play-by-play), Gary Reasons (Color) & Desmond Purnell (Sideline)

Game information

First quarter

- ISU – 10:52 Jared Barnett 13 yd run, Zach Guyer XP good (ISU 7–0)
- ISU – 03:26 Jeff Woody 1 yd run, Zach Guyer XP good (ISU 14–0)
- ISU – 02:20 Darius Darks 2 yd pass from Jared Barnett, Zach Guyer XP good (ISU 21–0)

Second quarter

- TTU – 08:33 Seth Doege 8 yd run, Donnie Carona XP good (ISU 21–7)
- ISU – 05:01 Zach Guyer 42 yd field goal (ISU 24–7)

Third quarter

- ISU – 13:48 Duran Hollis 71 yd run, Zach Guyer XP good (ISU 31–7)

Fourth quarter

- ISU – 11:08 James White 1 yd run, Zach Guyer XP good (ISU 38–7)
- ISU – 04:48 Zach Guyer 23 yd field goal (ISU 41–7)

Top passers

- ISU – Jared Barnett 14/26, 144 yards, 1 TD
- TTU – Seth Doege 16/32, 171 yards, 2 INT

Top rushers

- ISU – James White 31 attempts, 138 yards, 1 TD
- TTU – DeAndre Washington 11 attempts, 50 yards

Top receivers

- ISU – Josh Lenz 4 receptions, 74 yards
- TTU – Eric Ward 5 receptions, 62 yards

Top tacklers

- ISU – A.J. Klein 8 tackles
- TTU – Jared Flannel 9 tackles

=== Game 9: vs. Kansas Jayhawks ===
Game Nine: Kansas Jayhawks at Iowa State Cyclones – Game summary

Quarter	1	2	3	4	Total
Jayhawks	7	0	3	0	10
Cyclones	3	7	0	3	13

at Jack Trice Stadium, Ames, IA

- Date: November 5
- Game time: 11:40 a.m. CDT
- Game weather: Temperature: 47°F • Wind: SSE 10 G20 • Weather: Hazy
- Game attendance: 51,575
- Referee: Referee: Rick Loumiet • Umpire: Frank Villar • Linesman: Keith Johnson • Line judge: Mickey Bryson • Back judge: Donnie Aultman • Field judge: Jim Murphy • Side judge: John Masterson • Scorer: Shuey/Pope
- TV announcers (FCS): Steve Physioc (Play-by-play) & Yogi Roth (Color)

Game information

First quarter

- ISU – 05:23 Zach Guyer 32 yd field goal (ISU 3–0)
- KU – 10:52 D.J. Beshears 22 yd run, Alex Mueller XP good (KU 7–3)

Second quarter

- ISU – 04:45 Aaron Horne 18 yd run, Zach Guyer XP good (ISU 10–7)

Third quarter

- KU – 05:23 Ron Doherty 19 yd field goal (Tied 10–10)

Fourth quarter

- ISU – 04:48 Zach Guyer 42 yd field goal (ISU 13–10)

Top passers

- KU – Jordan Webb 13/21, 127 yards
- ISU – Jared Barnett 16/31, 175 yards, 1 INT

Top rushers

- KU – Darrian Miller 17 attempts, 70 yards
- ISU – Jared Barnett 22 attempts, 125 yards

Top receivers

- KU – D.J. Beshears 5 receptions, 45 yards
- ISU – Albert Gary 5 receptions, 57 yards

Top tacklers

- KU – Brad McDougald 11 tackles
- ISU – Jake Knott 10 tackles

=== Game 10: vs. Oklahoma State Cowboys ===
Game Ten: Oklahoma State Cowboys at Iowa State Cyclones – Game summary

Quarter	1	2	3	4	OT	2OT	Total
Cowboys	7	10	7	0	7	0	31
Cyclones	0	7	10	7	7	6	37

at Jack Trice Stadium, Ames, IA

- Date: November 18
- Game time: 7:06 p.m. CST
- Game weather: Temperature: 46°F • Wind: S 0–5 • Weather: Clear Skies
- Game attendance: 52,027
- Referee: Referee: Reggie Smith • Umpire: John Mascarello • Linesman: Chad Green • Line judge: David Oliver • Back judge: Brad Van Vark • Field judge: Scott Gaines • Side judge: Mike Contreraz • Scorer: Shuey/Pope
- TV announcers (ESPN): Joe Tessitore (Play-by-play), Rod Gilmore (Color) & Samantha Steele (Sideline)

Game information

First quarter

- OSU – 01:04 Shaun Lewis 70 yd interception return, Quinn Sharp XP good (OSU 7–0)

Second quarter

- OSU – 10:43 Quinn Sharp 29 yd field goal (OSU 10–0)
- ISU – 07:22 Darius Reynolds 16 yd pass from Jared Barnett, Zach Guyer XP good (OSU 10–7)
- OSU – 05:26 Justin Blackmon 27 yd pass from Brandon Weeden, Quinn Sharp XP good (OSU 17–7)

Third quarter

- OSU – 12:33 Tracy Moore 30 yd pass from Brandon Weeden, Quinn Sharp XP good (OSU 24–7)
- ISU – 10:05 James White 32 yd run, Zach Guyer XP good (OSU 24–14)
- ISU – 04:04 Zach Guyer 24 yd field goal (OSU 24–17)

Fourth quarter

- ISU – 04:48 Albert Gary 7 yd pass from Jared Barnett, Zach Guyer XP good (Tied 24–24)

OT

- ISU – 15:00 James White 25 yd pass from Jared Barnett, Zach Guyer XP good (ISU 31–24)
- OSU – 15:00 Josh Cooper 6 yd pass from Brandon Weeden, Quinn Sharp XP good (Tied 31–31)

2nd OT

- ISU – 15:00 Jeff Woody 4 yd run (ISU 37–31)

Top passers

- OSU – Brandon Weeden 42/58, 476 yards, 3 TD, 3 INT
- ISU – Jared Barnett 32/58, 376 yards, 3 TD, 2 INT

Top rushers

- OSU – Joseph Randle 10 attempts, 49 yards
- ISU – Jared Barnett 14 attempts, 87 yards

Top receivers

- OSU – Josh Cooper 13 receptions, 128 yards, 1 TD
- ISU – Albert Gary 7 receptions, 109 yards, 1 TD

Top tacklers

- OSU – Alex Elkins 10 tackles
- ISU – A.J. Klein 14 tackles

=== Game 11: at Oklahoma Sooners ===
Game Eleven: Iowa State Cyclones at Oklahoma Sooners – Game summary

Quarter	1	2	3	4	Total
Cyclones	6	0	0	0	6
Sooners	3	20	0	3	26

at Gaylord Family Oklahoma Memorial Stadium, Norman, OK

- Date: November 26
- Game time: 11:06 a.m. CST
- Game weather: Temperature: 48°F • Wind: NNW-32 • Weather: Overcast
- Game attendance: 84,326
- Referee: Referee: Matt Loeffler; Umpire: Rick Podraza • Linesman: Bill Scott • Line judge: Keith Garmond • Back judge: Terry White • Field judge: Randy Smith • Side judge: Anthony Fleming • Scorer: Gary Brown
- TV announcers (FX): Gus Johnson (Play-by-play), Charles Davis (Color) & Tim Brewster (Sideline)

Game information

First quarter

- OU – 11:15 Michael Hunnicutt 20 yd field goal (OU 3–0)
- ISU – 05:48 Albert Gary 10 yd pass from Jared Barnett, Zach Guyer XP no good (ISU 6–3)

Second quarter

- OU – 08:12 Blake Bell 3 yd run, Michael Hunnicutt XP good (OU 10–6)
- OU – 03:22 Blake Bell 1 yd run, Michael Hunnicutt XP good (OU 17–6)
- OU – 00:25 Michael Hunnicutt 28 yd field goal (OU 20–6)
- OU – 00:00 Michael Hunnicutt 37 yd field goal (OU 23–6)

Third quarter
Fourth quarter

- OU – 06:48 Michael Hunnicutt 21 yd field goal (OU 26–6)

Top passers

- ISU – Jared Barnett 13/28, 125 yards, 1 TD, 1 INT
- OU – Landry Jones 22/43, 256 yards, 2 INT

Top rushers

- ISU – Jeff Woody 13 attempts, 60 yards
- OU – Roy Finch 15 attempts, 83 yards

Top receivers

- ISU – Albert Gary 4 receptions, 52 yards, 1 TD
- OU – DeJuan Miller 7 receptions, 86 yards

Top tacklers

- ISU – A.J. Klein 12 tackles
- OU – Tom Wort 11 tackles

=== Game 12: at Kansas State Wildcats ===
Game Twelve: Iowa State Cyclones at Kansas State Wildcats – Game summary

Quarter	1	2	3	4	Total
Cyclones	13	0	7	3	23
Wildcats	7	10	3	10	30

at Bill Snyder Family Football Stadium, Manhattan, KS

- Date: December 3
- Game time: 11:30 a.m. CST
- Game weather: Temperature: 43°F • Wind: ENE 6 • Weather: Cloudy/Light Rain
- Game attendance: 47,392
- Referee: Randy Christal • Umpire: Tom Quick • Linesman: Cal McNeill • Line judge: Kelly Deterding • Back judge: Terry Jones • Field judge: Joe Blubaugh • Side judge: Tom Bessant
- TV announcers (FSN): Joel Meyers (Play-by-play), Brian Baldinger (Color) & Jim Knox (Sideline)

Game information

First quarter

- ISU – 02:01 Darius Darks 30 yd pass from Jared Barnett, Zach Guyer XP good (ISU 7–0)
- KSU – 01:47 Tramaine Thompson 68 yd pass from Collin Klein, Anthony Cantele XP good (Tied 7–7)
- ISU – 00:11 Jeff Woody 1 yd run, Zach Guyer XP blocked (ISU 13–7)

Second quarter

- KSU – 10:13 Anthony Cantele 37 yd field goal (ISU 13–10)
- KSU – 00:20 Collin Klein 1 yd run, Anthony Cantele XP good (KSU 17–13)

Third quarter

- KSU – 08:48 Anthony Cantele 47 yd field goal (KSU 20–13)
- ISU – 04:25 Jeff Woody 13 yd run, Zach Guyer XP good (Tied 20–20)

Fourth quarter

- KSU – 13:37 Anthony Cantele 19 yd field goal (KSU 23–20)
- ISU – 06:12 Zach Guyer 43 yd field goal (Tied 23–23)
- KSU – 03:29 John Hubert 26 yd run, Anthony Cantele XP good (KSU 30–23)

Top passers

- ISU – Jared Barnett 15/27, 153 yards, 1 TD, 1 INT
- KSU – Collin Klein 7/15, 158 yards, 1 TD

Top rushers

- ISU – Jeff Woody 23 attempts, 85 yards, 2 TD
- KSU – John Hubert 15 attempts, 120 yards, 1 TD

Top receivers

- ISU – Darius Reynolds 4 receptions, 56 yards
- KSU – Tramaine Thompson 2 receptions, 87 yards, 1 TD

Top tacklers

- ISU – Jacques Washington 8 tackles
- KSU – Arthur Brown 12 tackles

=== Game 13: vs Rutgers Scarlet Knights ===
Game Twelve: Iowa State Cyclones vs Rutgers Scarlet Knights - Game summary

Quarter	1	2	3	4	Total
Cyclones	6	0	0	7	13
Scarlet Knights	0	17	0	10	27

at Yankee Stadium, Bronx, NY

- Date: December 30
- Game time: 2:24 p.m. CST
- Game weather: Temperature: 50°F • Wind: S 6 • Weather: Sunny and clear
- Game attendance: 38,328
- Referee: Referee: Randy Smith • Umpire: Ramon George • Linesman: Steve Fleming • Line judge: Sarah Thomas • Back judge: Jabir Walker • Field judge: Scott Gasaway • Side judge: Tony Meyer • Scorer: Joe DiBari
- TV announcers (ESPN): Chris Fowler (Play-by-play), Jesse Palmer (Color) & Tom Rinaldi (Sideline)

Game information

First quarter

- ISU – 13:41 Zach Guyer 40 yd field goal (ISU 3–0)
- ISU – 07:35 Zach Guyer 46 yd field goal (ISU 6–0)

Second quarter

- RU – 12:39 Jawan Jamison 1 yd run, San San Te XP good (RU 7–6)
- RU – 10:30 San San Te 21 yd field goal (RU 10–6)
- RU – 02:24 Jawan Jamison 12 yd run, San San Te XP good (RU 17–6)

Third quarter
Fourth quarter

- RU – 13:21 San San Te 29 yd field goal (RU 20–6)
- ISU – 02:24 Jeff Woody 20 yd run, Zach Guyer XP good (RU 20–13)
- RU – 05:47 Brandon Coleman 68 yd pass from Chas Dodd, San San Te XP good (RU 27–13)

Top passers

- ISU – Steele Jantz 15/31, 197 yards, 2 INT
- RU – Chas Dodd 10/17, 176 yards, 1 TD

Top rushers

- ISU – James White 9 attempts, 42 yards
- RU – Jawan Jamison 27 attempts, 131 yards, 1 TD

Top receivers

- ISU – Aaron Horne 4 receptions, 72 yards
- RU – Mohamed Sanu 6 receptions, 62 yards

Top tacklers

- ISU – A.J. Klein 15 tackles
- RU – Khaseem Greene 13 tackles

== Personnel ==
=== Coaching staff ===
Name	Position	Seasons at Iowa State	Alma mater
Paul Rhoads	Head coach	3	Missouri Western (1989)
Wally Burnham	Defensive coordinator/linebackers	3	Samford (1963)
Tom Herman	Offensive coordinator/quarterbacks	3	California Lutheran (1997)
Kenith Pope	Running Backs	3	Oklahoma (1976)
Bobby Elliott	Defensive backs	2	Iowa (1975)
Luke Wells	Tight Ends	3	Oklahoma (2001)
Courtney Messingham	Wide Receivers	3	Northern Iowa (1990)
Curtis Bray	Defensive line	3	Pittsburgh (1992)
Bill Bleil	Assistant head coach/Offensive Line Coach	3	Northwestern College (1981)
