= Colley Matrix =

College football rating system

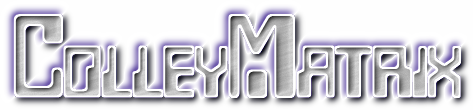

The Colley Matrix is a computer-generated sports rating system designed by Dr. Wesley Colley. It is one of more than 40 polls, rankings, and formulas recognized by the NCAA in its list of national champion selectors in college football.

== Methodology ==
In his initial paper at Princeton University, Colley states, "The method is based on very simple statistical principles, and uses only Div. I-A (Note: Division I-A is now known as the NCAA Division I Football Bowl Subdivision (FBS).) wins and losses as input — margin of victory does not matter. The scheme adjusts effectively for strength of schedule, in a way that is free of bias toward conference, tradition, or region." Colley claims that his method is bias-free for estimating the ranking of a team given a particular schedule, though his claim that the formula adjusts effectively for strength of schedule has been disputed. The resulting values for each team are identified as a ranking.

The formula was adjusted in 2007 to account for games against FCS teams.

Colley Matrix is a special case of the Generalized row sum method, a parametric family of ranking methods developed by P. Yu. Chebotarev (1989).

== National champions ==
As an NCAA-designated major selector, the NCAA regards the following teams as Colley's national champion selection, however these selections are listed under the "Final National Poll Leaders" section of the NCAA's record book rather than the "National Champions" section. Unlike most of the NCAA's major selectors, the Colley Matrix does not award a physical trophy to its national champion.

In four years (2011, 2012, 2016, 2017) the Colley Matrix selected a national champion that did not win the BCS or CFP national championship game. In each of the years, the Colley Matrix was the only NCAA-designated "major selector" to select that champion.

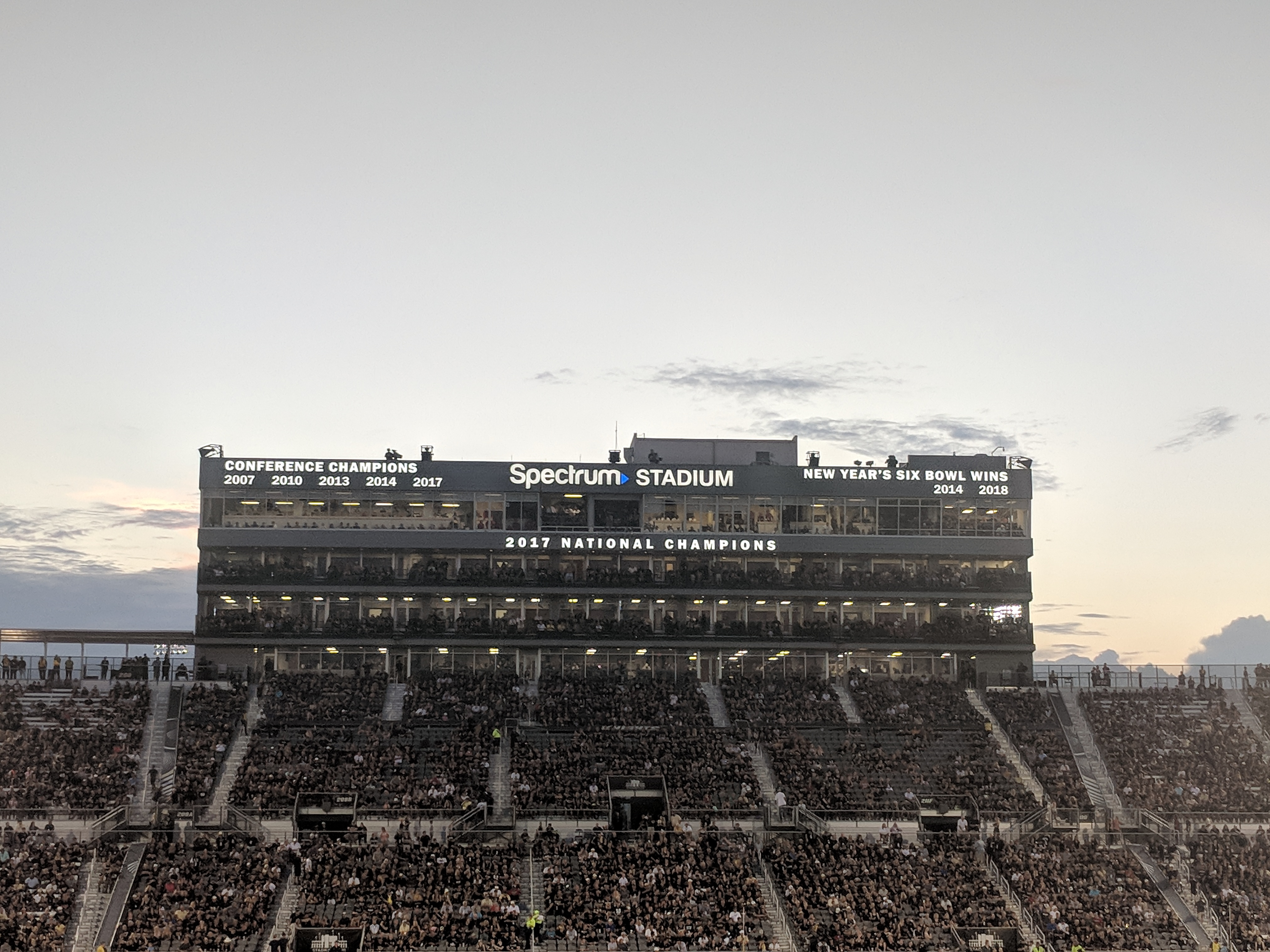
"2017 National Champions" signage at the home stadium of the UCF Knights football program; Colley Matrix ranked UCF first for the 2017 NCAA Division I FBS football season

Season	Champion	Record	Ref.
1998	Tennessee	13–0	
1999	Florida State	12–0	
2000	Oklahoma	13–0	
2001	Miami (FL)	12–0	
2002	Ohio State	14–0	
2003	LSU	13–1	
2004	USC	13–0 (Note: USC's record listed for 2004 includes two wins later vacated by the NCAA.)	
2005	Texas	13–0	
2006	Florida	13–1	
2007	LSU	12–2	
2008	Florida	13–1	
2009	Alabama	14–0	
2010	Auburn	14–0	
2011 †	Oklahoma State	12–1	
2012 †	Notre Dame	12–1	
2013	Florida State	14–0	
2014	Ohio State	14–1	
2015	Alabama	14–1	
2016 †	Alabama	14–1	
2017 †	UCF	13–0	
2018	Clemson	15–0	
2019	LSU	15–0	
2020	Alabama	13–0	
2021	Georgia	14–1	
2022	Georgia	15–0	
2023	Michigan	15–0	
2024	Ohio State	14–2	
2025	Indiana	16–0	

† Years in which Colley Matrix selection did not win BCS or CFP national championship game.

== History ==
The NCAA record book indicates that the Colley Matrix has been active since 1992, however this appears to be an error and no Colley selections are listed for 1992–1997. The season rankings on Colley's own website begin in 1998. The Colley Matrix was one of the computer rankings used during Bowl Championship Series (BCS) system of determining national championship game participants starting in the 2001 season. The Peter Wolfe and Wes Colley/Atlanta Journal-Constitution computer rankings were used in place of The New York Times and Dunkel rankings. The change was made because the BCS wanted computer rankings that did not depend heavily on margin of victory.

The Colley Matrix has chosen a different national champion from the Bowl Championship Series or College Football Playoff champion four times:

- 2011 — Colley Matrix ranked Oklahoma State as first, although the team did not play in the 2012 BCS National Championship Game and finished No. 3 in both the AP Poll and Coaches Poll.
- 2012 — Colley Matrix ranked Notre Dame as first and Alabama second despite the Crimson Tide defeating the Fighting Irish 42–14 in the 2013 BCS National Championship Game.
- 2016 — Colley Matrix ranked Alabama first and Clemson second despite Clemson beating Alabama 35–31 in the 2017 College Football Playoff National Championship.
- 2017 — Colley Matrix ranked UCF first, while UCF finished No. 6 in the AP Poll and No. 7 in the Coaches Poll. UCF was not selected for the 2018 College Football Playoff despite being the only undefeated FBS team that season, albeit with a much weaker strength of schedule than the teams picked above them (103 at the end of the regular season, while playoff semifinalists Clemson, Oklahoma, Georgia, and Alabama's strengths of schedule ranked 38, 24, 27, and 34, respectively).

In each of the above instances, the Colley Matrix was the only NCAA recognized selector to choose a champion other than the BCS or CFP winner.

== Criticism and controversies ==
The methodology of the rankings have been questioned by others on the grounds of subjectivity and specifics of the statistical math. It has also been criticized for placing too much weight on a team's win-loss record and not correctly emphasizing a team's strength of schedule, strength of record, margin of victory, and head-to-head results, as well as for problems with the formula used for the calculation. Dr. Ed Feng, a mathematician at Stanford University, criticized the system because it does not consider specific game results, stating that "[t]he method does not care who a team loses to in ranking them. It considers the win loss record of each team and the number of games played between each pair of teams. However, the specifics of who won each game are not an input to Colley’s method".

In the final BCS rankings for the 2010 season, LSU was incorrectly ranked ahead of Boise State, at No. 10 instead of No. 11. The error was a result of Colley failing to input an FCS playoff game (Appalachian State vs. Western Illinois) correctly, a mistake that affected an order that helped determine bowl pairings that season.

The ranking system was widely criticized after ranking Notre Dame ahead of Alabama for the 2012 season following the 2013 BCS National Championship Game, in which Alabama defeated Notre Dame 42–14. It was similarly criticized after ranking Alabama first and Clemson second for the 2016 season following the 2017 College Football Playoff National Championship, in which Clemson defeated Alabama 35–31.

The Colley Matrix is most well known for ranking UCF ahead of Alabama in 2017 despite Alabama's victory in that season's College Football Playoff. Central Florida later proclaimed themselves as co-national champions because of the ranking, becoming the only school to claim a national championship based solely on the Colley Matrix. UCF was not selected for the College Football Playoff that season.

In 2018, the Mountain West Conference moved away from using four polls, one being Colley Matrix, to determine the host site for its conference championship game in football, due to "a shift to place a priority on head-to-head competition."

Since its creation, the four instances in which the Colley Matrix has chosen a different national champion from the BCS/CFP winner are the most of any NCAA recognized selector in that timeframe. Colley Matrix is also the only NCAA recognized selector to ever choose a different champion than the CFP (in use since the 2014 season), which it has done twice.

== In college basketball ==
Colley's formula is also used for men's college basketball rankings (though this serves no purpose in terms of awarding a national champion and is not used by the March Madness selection committee). These rankings are updated daily rather than weekly like they are for football or the college basketball AP Poll and were first used in the 2002–03 season. Like with the football rankings, the Colley Matrix has often ranked a team that did not win that season's NCAA tournament first, doing so on 15 occasions (Note: 2002–03: Chose Kentucky instead of NCAA tournament winner Syracuse. 2003–04: Chose Duke instead of NCAA tournament winner UConn 2004–05: Chose Illinois instead of NCAA tournament winner North Carolina. 2005–06: Chose Duke instead of NCAA tournament winner Florida. 2006–07: Chose Ohio State instead of NCAA tournament winner Florida. 2007–08: Chose North Carolina instead of NCAA tournament winner Kansas. 2009–10: Chose Kansas instead of NCAA tournament winner Duke. 2010–11: Chose Kansas instead of NCAA tournament winner UConn. 2013–14: Chose Florida instead of NCAA tournament winner UConn. 2014–15: Chose Kentucky instead of NCAA tournament winner Duke. 2016–17: Chose Kansas instead of NCAA tournament winner North Carolina. 2020–21: Chose Gonzaga instead of NCAA tournament winner Baylor 2022–23: Chose Alabama instead of NCAA tournament winner UConn. 2023–24: Chose Purdue instead of NCAA tournament winner UConn. 2024–25: Chose Auburn instead of NCAA tournament winner Florida.) in 21 seasons as of the 2024–25 championship (not including the 2019–20 season, in which the NCAA tournament was canceled due to the COVID-19 pandemic).
