= Markelle Martin =

American gridiron football player (born 1990)

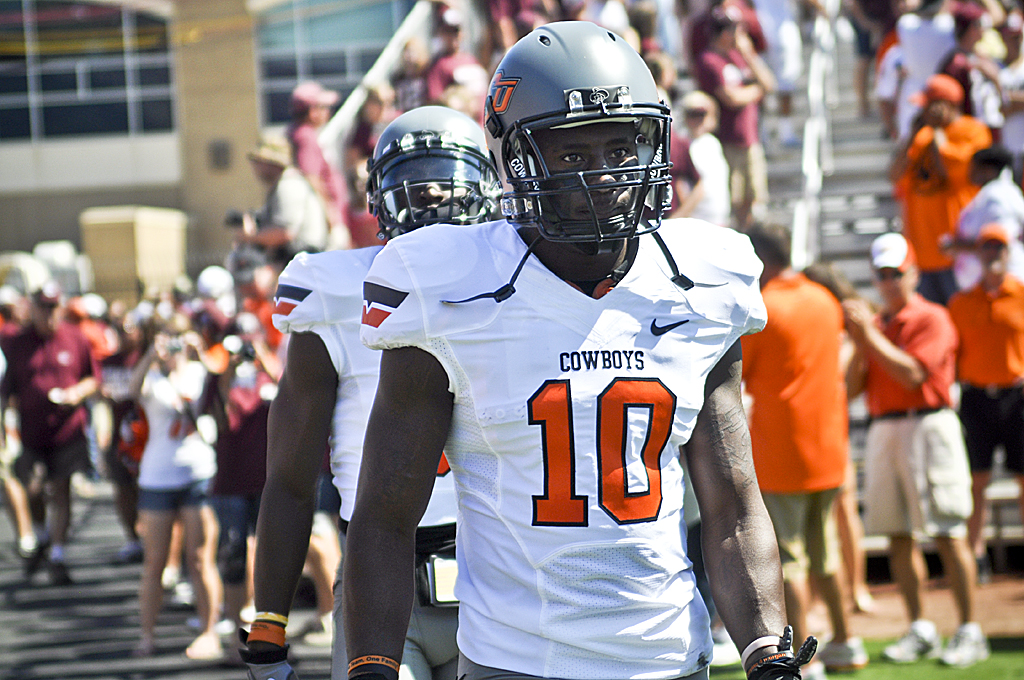
- Martin with Oklahoma State in 2011

No. 31, 26
- Position: Safety

Personal information
- Born: June 20, 1990 (age 36); Wichita Falls, Texas, U.S.
- Listed height: 6 ft 1 in (1.85 m)
- Listed weight: 198 lb (90 kg)

Career information
- High school: S. H. Rider (Wichita Falls)
- College: Oklahoma State
- NFL draft: 2012: 6th round, 190th overall pick

Career history
- Tennessee Titans (2012–2013); Toronto Argonauts (2014)*
- * Offseason or practice squad member only

Awards and highlights
- First-team All-American (2011)
- Stats at Pro Football Reference

Markelle Martin (born June 20, 1990) is an American former professional football player who was a safety for the Tennessee Titans of the National Football League (NFL). He played college football for the Oklahoma State Cowboys and was selected by the Titans in the sixth round of the 2012 NFL draft. Martin suffered numerous injuries over the course of his career and ended up never taking a snap of NFL football.

== Early life ==
Martin attended S. H. Rider High School in Wichita Falls, Texas. He played both safety and wide receiver. As a senior, he had 81 tackles and five interceptions. He was a first-team 4A all-state selection as a senior after leading Rider to a 12–2 record and was voted as his district's defensive player of the year.

== College career ==
As a freshman in 2008, Martin played in eleven games and had four tackles and broke up four passes. He broke up a pass and blocked a punt against Missouri State.

As a sophomore in 2009 he started 11 games, missing two with an injury. He finished fifth on the team with 45 tackles, and second on the team with 11 pass break-ups. His most productive game of the season came in the Cotton Bowl with nine tackles and a pass break-up in the defense's impressive outing against Ole Miss.

As a junior in 2010, Martin started all 13 games of the season. He had 55 tackles, 10 pass break-ups, three interceptions, returning one for a touchdown. The touchdown was a 62-yard return during the 2010 Alamo Bowl. He also recorded 4 tackles during the game and was named the Defensive Player of the Game. Following the 2010 season, Martin was named the Nate Fleming Award winner. The award is given to Oklahoma State student-athletes who overcome struggles to excel both on the field and in the classroom.

Martin again started all 13 contests of the 2011 season, finishing his career by starting in 37 straight contests. For the season, Martin had 74 tackles, 11 pass breakups, 2 forced fumbles and one recovered. He was named as a Jim Thorpe Award semifinalist and earned All-Big 12 first-team honors. He also was selected as a first-team All-American by the American Football Coaches Association.

== Professional career ==
=== Tennessee Titans ===
Martin was selected by the Tennessee Titans in the sixth round (190th overall) of the 2012 NFL draft. He signed a four-year deal with the Titans on May 18, 2012. On August 27, 2013, Martin was waived/injured by the Titans. On August 28, 2013, he cleared waivers and was placed on the Titans' injured reserve list.

=== Toronto Argonauts ===
Martin was signed by the Toronto Argonauts on March 27, 2014. He was released on June 13, 2014.

== Coaching career ==
Martin currently serves as a coach at Greenwood High School.
