= Brandon Weeden =

American football player (born 1983)

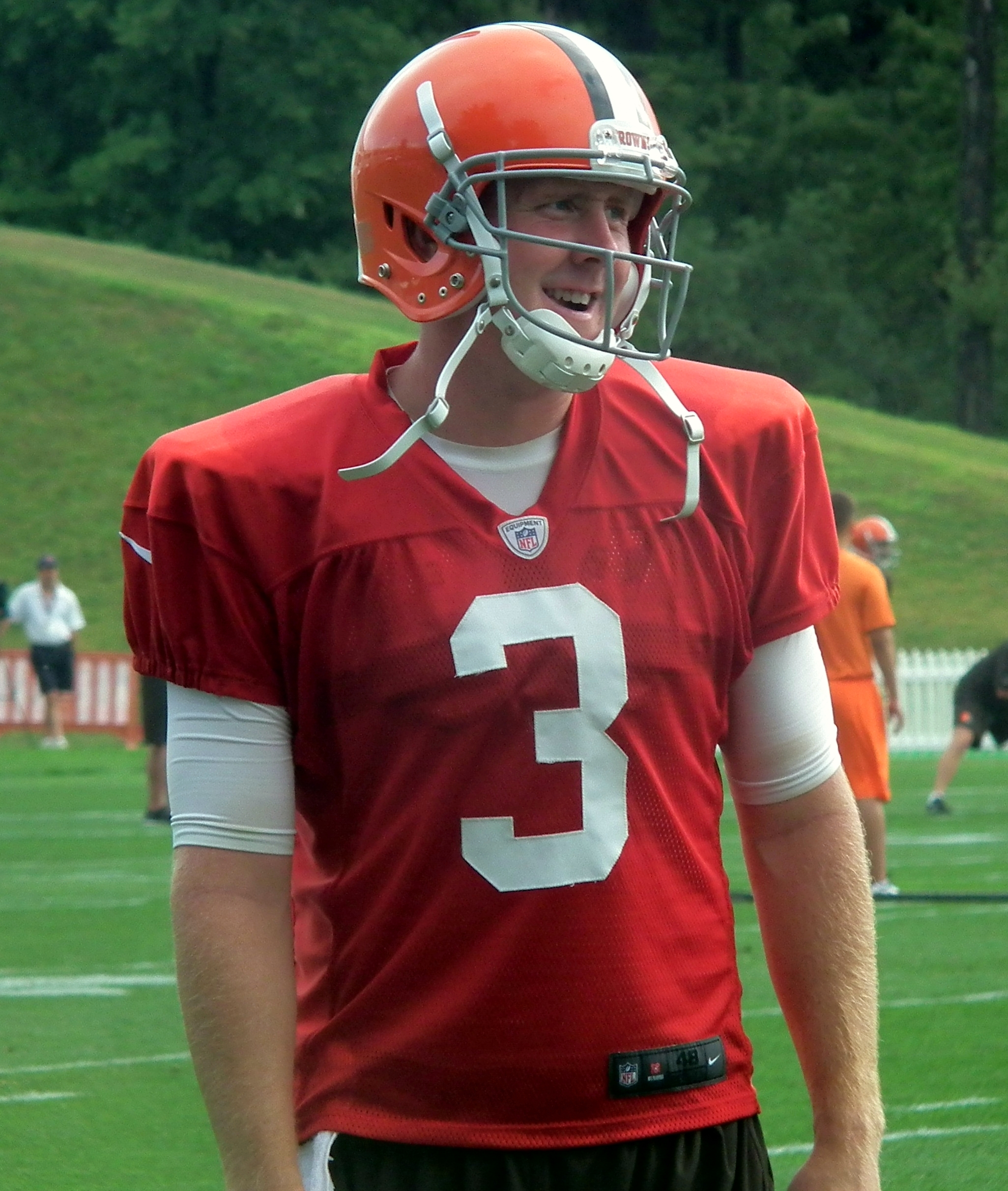
- Weeden with the Cleveland Browns in 2012

No. 3, 5
- Position: Quarterback

Personal information
- Born: October 14, 1983 (age 43); Oklahoma City, Oklahoma, U.S.
- Listed height: 6 ft 3 in (1.91 m)
- Listed weight: 230 lb (104 kg)

Career information
- High school: Santa Fe (Edmond, Oklahoma)
- College: Oklahoma State (2007–2011)
- NFL draft: 2012: 1st round, 22nd overall pick

Career history
- Cleveland Browns (2012–2013); Dallas Cowboys (2014–2015); Houston Texans (2015–2016); Tennessee Titans (2017); Houston Texans (2018)

Awards and highlights
- First-team All-Big 12 (2010); Second-team All-Big 12 (2011)

Career NFL statistics
- Passing completions: 559
- Passing attempts: 965
- Completion percentage: 57.9%
- Passing yards: 6,462
- TD–INT: 31–30
- Passer rating: 76.0
- Stats at Pro Football Reference

Brandon Kyle Weeden (born October 14, 1983) is an American former professional football quarterback who played in the National Football League (NFL) for seven seasons. After pursuing a baseball career from 2002 to 2006, Weeden played college football for the Oklahoma State Cowboys, receiving first-team All-Big 12 honors in 2010. Selected 22nd overall by the Cleveland Browns in the 2012 NFL draft, he was the NFL's oldest first round selection at age 28. Weeden served as the Browns' starter during his rookie season and spent the remainder of his career as backup on the Dallas Cowboys, Houston Texans, and Tennessee Titans.

== Early life ==
Weeden was the starting quarterback at Edmond Santa Fe High School, where he led the team to the state semifinals and was named team MVP and offensive player of the year. He finished 2nd in the state of Oklahoma in passing yards with 2,863 and accounted for 25 touchdowns. He was named All-State in football and later that year was also named All-State in baseball. Weeden graduated from Edmond Santa Fe High School in 2002.

Brandon Weeden
- Pitcher
- Batted: Right Threw: Right

MILB debut
- June 18, 2002, for the GCL Yankees

Last MILB appearance
- September 3, 2006, for the High Desert Mavericks

MILB statistics
- Win–loss record: 19–26
- ERA: 5.02
- Strikeouts: 344
- Stats at Baseball Reference

Teams
- GCL Yankees (2002–2003); Staten Island Yankees (2003); Columbus Catfish (2004–2005); High Desert Mavericks (2006)

== Professional baseball career ==
A pitcher, Weeden was selected in the second round of the 2002 Major League Baseball draft by the New York Yankees as their first selection in the draft. After the 2003 season, he was traded to the Los Angeles Dodgers with Jeff Weaver and Yhency Brazobán for Kevin Brown. Following the 2005 season, he was selected in the Rule 5 draft by the Kansas City Royals. Weeden played his last season of professional baseball in 2006 for the Class-A High Desert Mavericks of the California League. Injuries and poor performance led Weeden to quit baseball.

== College football career ==
Weeden enrolled at Oklahoma State University in 2007 and redshirted his first year with the Cowboys. The following year, in 2008, he appeared in only one game against Missouri State.

Starting in 2009, Weeden played in three games, including one in the absence of injured Zac Robinson on Nov. 19. Alex Cate started the game, but Weeden replaced him at halftime and led the Cowboys to an 11-point comeback victory, 31–28, over Colorado in the nationally televised Thursday night game.

In 2010, Weeden was named the starter for the Oklahoma State Cowboys. In Week 2, Weeden suffered a severe injury to his thumb, which led to two interceptions and two fumbles in a win over Troy. Weeden said, "Hurt thumb, no thumb, whatever, it doesn't matter. I don't care if I don't have a thumb. You've got to take the snaps." He followed that performance by throwing six touchdowns the following week. He was named Big-12 Offensive Player of the Week in the victory over Tulsa.

The win helped move Oklahoma State into the Coaches' Poll top 25 for the first time in 2010. Coach Gundy reflected on the win: "Sometimes, you have games like that. We were rolling on all cylinders." Weeden added, "We had a great week of practice. ... It was a whole lot of fun tonight."

"Such a big deal has been made of my age. I use it to my advantage. I think it's a positive this year. I think it's a positive for my future. It's one of those deals, the way I look at it is, name one person who wouldn't want to be in the position I am, and have the kind of path I've had?"

— Brandon Weeden

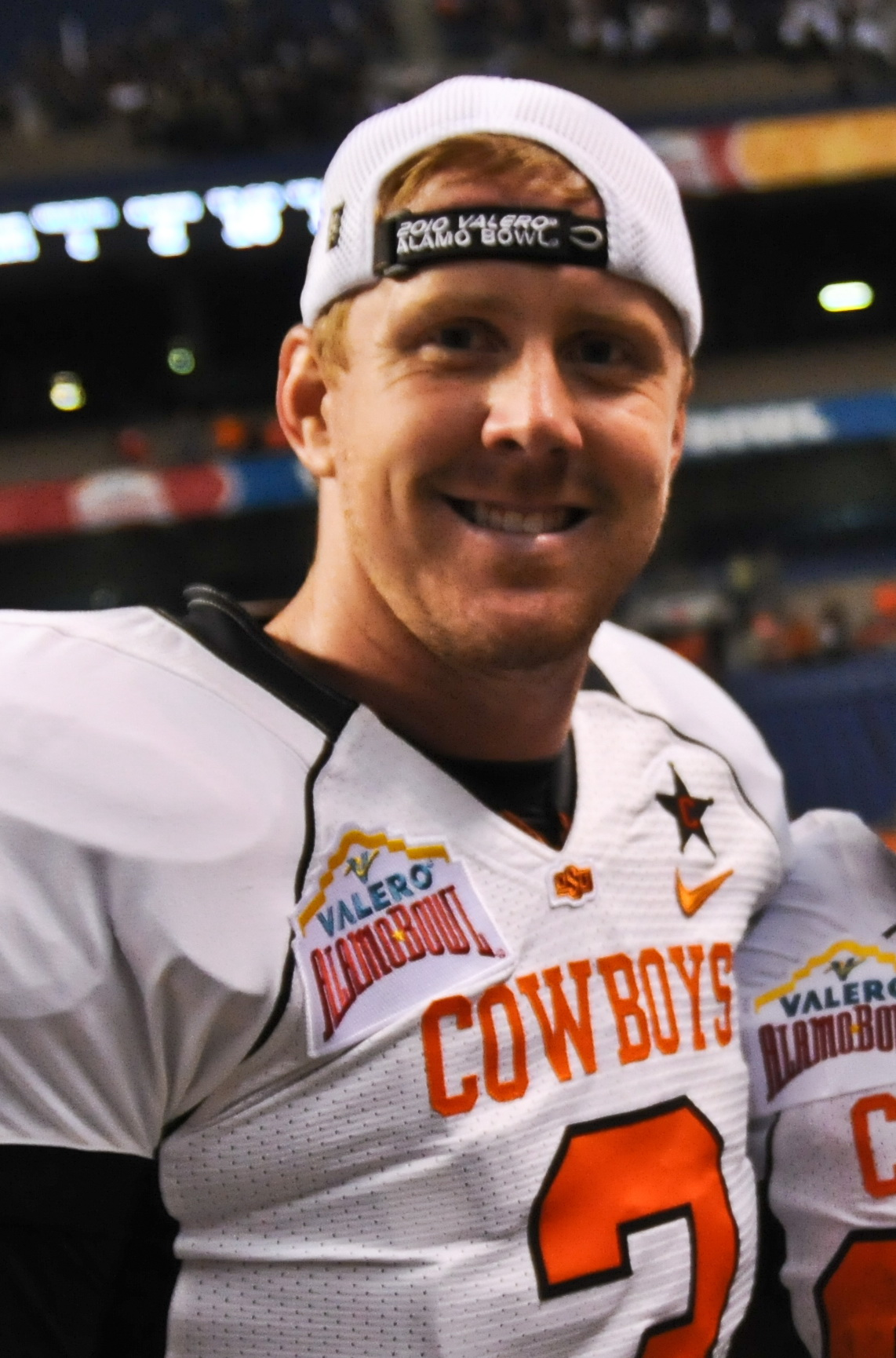
Weeden in 2011

In his senior season, 2011, he led Oklahoma State to an 11–1 regular season, a number 3 ranking in the BCS standings, and a berth in the 2012 BCS Tostitos Fiesta Bowl. He also broke school records in total attempts, completions, yardage, and touchdowns (all which were previously held by incumbent Coach Mike Gundy). In 12 games, Weeden completed 379 of 522 passes for 4,328 yards.

In the 2012 Fiesta Bowl, the last game of his college football career, Weeden threw for 399 yards, completed 29 of 42 passes, and had 4 touchdowns (3 passing, 1 rushing) along with one interception in a 41–38 win against the Stanford Cardinal.

== Professional football career ==
Pre-draft measurables
Height	Weight	Arm length	Hand span	Wingspan	40-yard dash	10-yard split	20-yard split	20-yard shuttle	Three-cone drill	Vertical jump	Broad jump	Wonderlic
6 ft 3 1/2 in (1.92 m)	221 lb (100 kg)	31 3/4 in (0.81 m)	9 5/8 in (0.24 m)	6 ft 4 1/8 in (1.93 m)	4.89 s	1.66 s	2.85 s	4.45 s	7.36 s	32 in (0.81 m)	8 ft 6 in (2.59 m)	27
Measurables are from NFL Combine; all other values from Oklahoma State Pro Day (2012-03-09)

=== Cleveland Browns ===
==== 2012 season ====
Weeden was selected by the Cleveland Browns as the 22nd pick in the 2012 NFL draft. Weeden became the oldest player ever taken in the first round, at 28 years old.

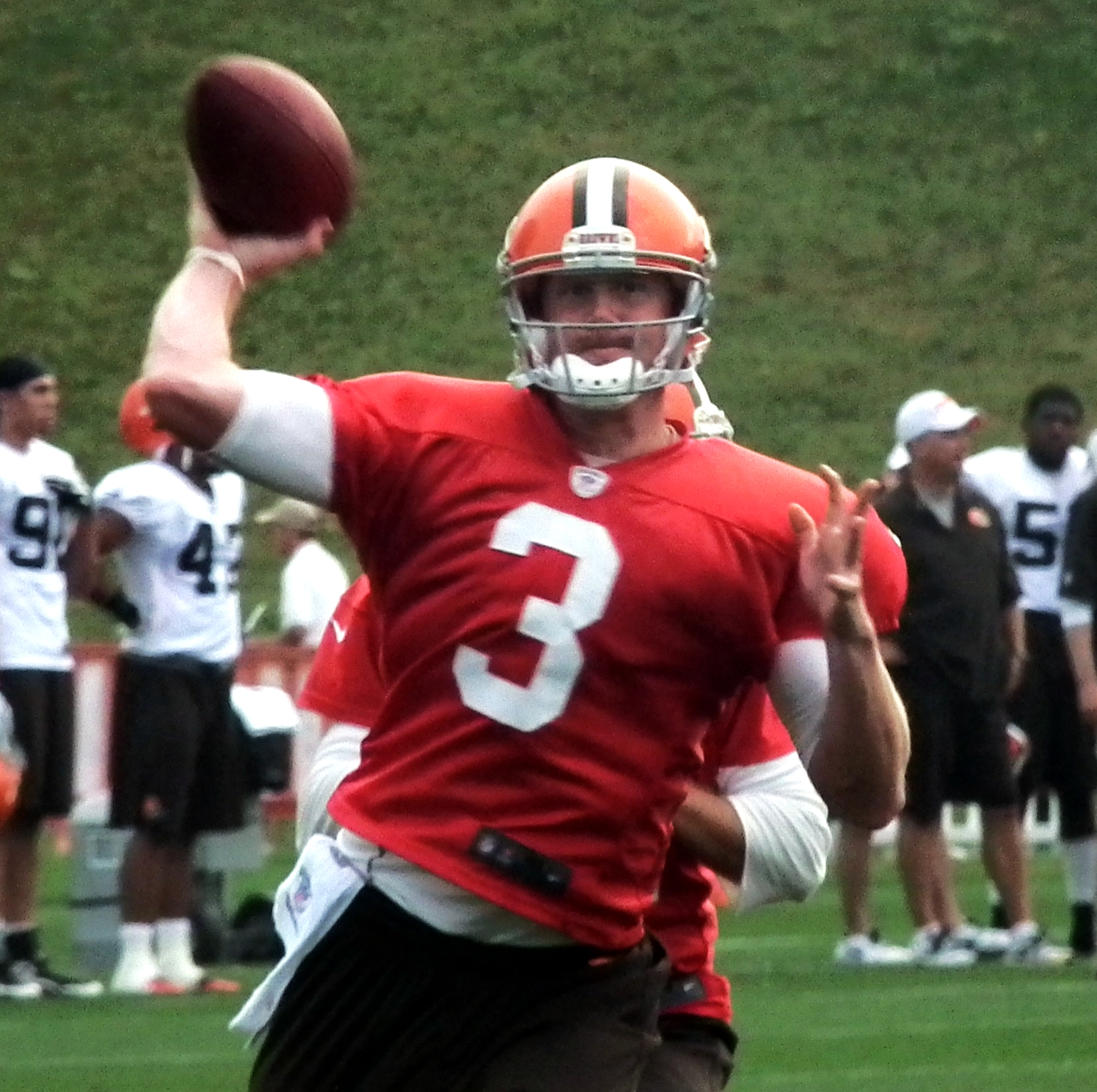
Weeden during Browns training camp

Going into the 2012 regular season, the Browns named Weeden their starting quarterback. In his first game, Weeden had a 5.1 passer rating after throwing four interceptions in a loss to the Philadelphia Eagles, which is the sixth lowest in a season opener by any quarterback attempting at least 15 passes since the merger in 1970. However, one week later, he was much improved throwing for 2 touchdowns, completed 26 passes on 37 attempts for 322 yards, no interceptions with a passer rating of 114.9. During Week 6, Weeden celebrated his 29th birthday by completing 17 passes on 29 attempts for 231 yards and 2 touchdowns en route to his first NFL win by defeating the intrastate rival Cincinnati Bengals. In the Browns victory over the Pittsburgh Steelers in Week 12, Weeden's helmet collided with Joe Thomas' knee, giving him a concussion. Weeden practiced three days later, and played the following week against the Oakland Raiders. For the season, Weeden threw for 3,385 yards.

==== 2013 season ====
Weeden won the starting job for the 2013 season, but injured his thumb in the fourth quarter of Week 2 in a 14–6 loss at Baltimore. He smashed his thumb on the helmet of left guard John Greco while throwing a pass and had to leave the game for treatment and X-rays. Backup Jason Campbell played the Browns' final offensive series as they dropped to 0–2. The Browns won their first game of the season the next week under 3rd string quarterback Brian Hoyer, with Weeden sidelined by his thumb injury. The following week it was announced Weeden would again sit for Week 4, giving Hoyer another start. On September 28, Weeden admitted that he was not guaranteed to reclaim the starting quarterback position over Hoyer when he returned from injury. The next day the Browns again won under Hoyer, leaving Weeden's status on the team in question. The next day, on September 30, it was announced Weeden would again sit in favor of Hoyer. However, the Browns had still not named who their permanent starter would be going forward. On Thursday Night Football vs the Buffalo Bills, Hoyer went down during the game and was replaced by Weeden. Weeden was able to guide the Browns to their third straight victory as they won, 37–24, over the Bills. The next day on October 4, it was announced that Hoyer would miss the rest of the 2013 regular season with a torn ACL. Despite the injury to Hoyer, Weeden was not guaranteed to reclaim the starting quarterback position. Later in the week, it was announced Weeden would start Week 6 for the Browns, and would remain the starter for the future if his play didn't begin to regress. In his Week 6 start, Weeden completed 26 of 43 passes for 292 yards, 2 touchdowns, and 2 interceptions in a 31–17 loss to the Detroit Lions, leading head coach Rob Chudzinski to declare that the Browns would stick with Weeden as the starting quarterback. Weeden put out another poor performance Week 7 vs the Green Bay Packers, completing only 17 of 42 passes for 149 yards, 1 touchdown, and 1 interception in a 31–13 loss to the Packers. On October 23, Weeden was once again benched, this time in favor of Campbell, for the Browns' Week 8 matchup vs. the 7–0 Kansas City Chiefs.

On March 12, 2014, the Browns released Weeden after two seasons with the team.

=== Dallas Cowboys ===
==== 2014 season ====
Weeden with the Dallas Cowboys in 2014

The Dallas Cowboys signed Weeden to a two-year contract on March 17. He was promoted to the backup quarterback position after the Cowboys waived Kyle Orton on July 15. Following a Week 8 back injury to Tony Romo, Weeden was named the starter in a 28–17 loss against the playoff bound Arizona Cardinals. He also closed out wins against Jacksonville, Indianapolis and Washington.

==== 2015 season ====
Weeden began the season again as Romo's backup. During a Week 2 game against the Eagles, Romo fractured his clavicle and Weeden closed out the win. It was announced that Romo would be placed on short term IR, which left him designated to return November 22, and that Weeden would be the starter at quarterback. Even though he was preparing to be the starter, with owner Jerry Jones and head coach Jason Garrett commenting on his positive progress the Cowboys covered themselves by trading for Matt Cassel on September 22. Weeden started three games, completing 71 percent of his attempts for 666 yards and one touchdown with two interceptions, but lost all three games. On October 13, the Cowboys decided to bench him and instead play Cassel, who started four games (all losses). On November 17, Weeden was waived to make room for Romo, with the team deciding to keep Cassel as the main backup.

=== Houston Texans (first stint) ===
==== 2015 season ====
Weeden was claimed off waivers by the Houston Texans on November 18. He debuted with the team in a game against the Indianapolis Colts on December 20, leading the Texans to their first-ever victory in Indianapolis after starting quarterback T. J. Yates was injured.

On December 27, Weeden made his first start with the Texans against the Tennessee Titans. He was 15–24 for 200 yards and 2 touchdowns, while also rushing for 11 yards and another score as the Texans won by a score of 34–6. The next week he returned to a backup role after Brian Hoyer (concussion) was cleared to play. Weeden was also Hoyer's backup for the Texans' 30–0 playoff loss to the Kansas City Chiefs.

==== 2016 season ====
On April 1, 2016, Weeden re-signed with the Texans on a two-year, $4 million contract. He spent the 2016 season as the third-string quarterback behind a combination of Brock Osweiler and Tom Savage. Weeden did not appear in a game in 2016. He was Osweiler's backup for the playoff win against the Oakland Raiders.

On September 2, 2017, Weeden was released by the Texans.

=== Tennessee Titans ===
On October 3, 2017, Weeden signed with the Tennessee Titans. He was only active for one game with the team. He became a free agent after the season.

=== Houston Texans (second stint) ===
On March 27, 2018, Weeden signed with the Texans. He was the backup to Deshaun Watson for 2018, appearing in only one game for one play.

== Career statistics ==
=== NFL ===
Year	Team	Games		Passing								Rushing				Sacked		Fumbles	
Year	Team	GP	GS	Att	Cmp	Pct	Yds	Avg	TD	Int	Rtg	Att	Yds	Avg	TD	Sck	SckY	Fum	Lost
2012	CLE	15	15	517	297	57.4	3,385	6.5	14	17	72.6	27	111	4.1	0	28	186	6	1
2013	CLE	8	5	267	141	52.8	1,731	6.5	9	9	70.3	12	44	3.7	0	27	180	6	2
2014	DAL	5	1	41	24	58.5	303	7.4	3	2	85.7	6	-1	-0.2	0	1	9	1	0
2015	DAL	4	3	98	71	72.4	738	7.5	2	2	92.1	9	30	3.3	0	8	62	0	0
2015	HOU	2	1	42	26	61.9	305	7.3	3	0	107.7	7	17	2.4	1	1	3	2	1
2016	HOU	0	0	DNP															
2017	TEN	0	0	DNP															
2018	HOU	1	0	0	0	0.0	0	0.0	0	0	0.0	0	0	0.0	0	0	0	0	0
Career		35	25	965	559	57.9	6,462	6.7	31	30	76.0	61	201	3.3	1	66	452	15	4

=== College ===
Season	Team	GP	Passing						
Season	Team	GP	Cmp	Att	Pct	Yds	TD	Int	Rtg
2008	Oklahoma State	1	1	3	33.3	8	0	0	55.7
2009	Oklahoma State	3	15	24	62.5	248	4	1	196.0
2010	Oklahoma State	13	342	511	66.9	4,277	34	13	154.1
2011	Oklahoma State	13	409	565	72.4	4,727	37	13	159.7
Totals		30	767	1,103	69.5	9,260	75	27	157.6

== Career highlights ==
=== Awards and honors ===
- 2010 All-Big 12 Quarterback, First-team
- 2010 Player of the Year Award (3rd, behind teammates Kendall Hunter and Justin Blackmon)
- 2010 Manning Award Finalist
- 2012 Tostitos Fiesta Bowl Champion (Beat Stanford, 41–38)

=== Oklahoma State records ===
Weeden set numerous records for passing, and offensive performance at Oklahoma State University, many of which surpassed records set by his college coach, Mike Gundy, when Gundy was a player.

- Passing yards, season – 4,727 (2011)
- Total offense, season – 4,625 (2011)
- Completed passes, season – 409 (2011)
- Completion percentage, season – 72.3 (2011)
- Completions, single game – 47 (2011, versus Texas A&M)

== Personal life ==
In the summer of 2009, he married Melanie Meuser. They have two sons, Cooper and Case.

== See also ==
- Rule 5 draft results
