= Glenn Spencer (American football) =

American football player and coach (born 1964)

Biographical details
- Born: May 1, 1964 (age 62); Douglasville, Georgia, U.S.

Playing career
- 1982–1985: Georgia Tech
- Position: Defensive tackle

Coaching career (HC unless noted)
- 1990–1996: West Georgia (LB)
- 1997: West Georgia (DC)
- 1998–2000: West Georgia
- 2001: Georgia Tech (RB)
- 2002–2003: Georgia Tech (DL)
- 2004–2006: Duke (AHC/DB/RC)
- 2007: Duke (AHC/ILB/RC)
- 2008: Oklahoma State (DL)
- 2009–2010: Oklahoma State (LB)
- 2011–2012: Oklahoma State (co-DC/LB)
- 2013–2017: Oklahoma State (DC/LB)
- 2018: Charlotte (DC/LB)
- 2019: Florida Atlantic (DC/LB)
- 2019: Florida Atlantic (interim HC)
- 2020: South Florida (DC/LB)
- 2021: South Florida (DC/S)
- 2022–2024: Wake Forest (LB)

Head coaching record
- Overall: 29–7 (college)
- Bowls: 1–0
- Tournaments: 0–2 (NCAA D-II playoffs)

Accomplishments and honors

Championships
- 2 GSC (1998, 2000)

Glenn Spencer (born May 1, 1964) is an American college football coach. He was most recently the linebackers coach at Wake Forest University. Spencer previously served as the defensive coordinator and safeties coach at the University of South Florida. He played college football at Georgia Tech.

== Early life and playing career ==
A native of Douglasville, Georgia, Spencer was a four-year letterman at Georgia Tech from 1982 to 1985, where he played defensive tackle. He earned a degree in management from Georgia Tech in 1987.

== Coaching career ==
=== Early coaching career ===
Spencer began his coaching career at West Georgia, where he spent seven seasons as the linebackers coach, before being promoted to defensive coordinator in 1997. He was promoted to head coach in 1998, and spent 3 seasons as head coach of the Wolves, accumulating a 28–7 record, as well as two Gulf South Conference titles. Spencer was inducted into the West Georgia Hall of Fame in 2017.

Spencer was hired as an assistant coach at his alma mater Georgia Tech, where he spent his first season as the running backs coach before being shifted to the defensive line coach for two seasons. He left Georgia Tech to accept a position on former college teammate Ted Roof's inaugural staff at Duke.

=== Duke ===
Spencer was named the assistant head coach and defensive backs coach at Duke in 2004, where he also served as the team's recruiting coordinator. He spent the first three seasons as the defensive backs coach before being shifted to coach inside linebackers in 2007. Following the termination of Roof after the 2007 season, he was not retained by the next head coach David Cutcliffe.

=== Oklahoma State ===
Spencer was hired on Mike Gundy's coaching staff in 2008 to serve as the team's defensive line coach. He was shifted to coach linebackers in 2009, where he remained the linebackers coach for the rest of his tenure in Stillwater. He added co-defensive coordinator duties in addition to his linebackers coaching duties in 2011 before being named the defensive coordinator in 2013. Spencer was not retained by Oklahoma State after the 2017 season.

=== Charlotte ===
Following his termination from Oklahoma State, Spencer was hired by Charlotte as the defensive coordinator and linebackers coach for the 2018 season. During his lone season at Charlotte, the 49ers only had a 5–7 record despite Spencer's defense being in the top 25 in terms of yards allowed. He left Charlotte after head coach Brad Lambert was fired and Will Healy was hired.

=== Florida Atlantic ===
Spencer was named to Lane Kiffin's staff at Florida Atlantic to serve as the defensive coordinator and linebackers coach for the 2019 season. Hours after Florida Atlantic's victory in their conference championship game, Kiffin departed Florida Atlantic to take the head coaching job at Ole Miss. Spencer was named the interim head coach for their bowl game against SMU. Despite the Florida Atlantic players lobbying for Spencer to be named the permanent head coach, former Florida State head coach Willie Taggart was named the team's new head coach.

=== South Florida ===
Spencer was named the defensive coordinator and linebackers coach for the South Florida football team, joining his counterpart, former Florida Atlantic offensive coordinator Charlie Weis Jr. on Jeff Scott's inaugural staff. He and Weis were both signed to three year deals—Spencer's salary was $500,000. On November 21, 2021, Spencer was fired by head coach Jeff Scott after posting a bottom 10 defense in all of FBS for the 2021 season.

=== Wake Forest ===
In February 2022, Spencer was hired as the linebackers coach for the Wake Forest Demon Deacons football team by head coach Dave Clawson.

== Personal life ==
Spencer's wife, Angela, died in 2011 from heart disease. The couple had two sons, Luke and Abraham. Spencer and former ESPN reporter Jeannine Edwards were engaged on February 17, 2013, and were married on July 12, 2013.

== Head coaching record ==
Year	Team	Overall	Conference	Standing	Bowl/playoffs	NCAA DII^{#}
West Georgia Braves (Gulf South Conference) (1998–2000)
1998	West Georgia	10–2	8–1	T–1st	L NCAA Division II First Round	18
1999	West Georgia	8–3	7–2	T–2nd		
2000	West Georgia	10–2	8–1	T–1st	L NCAA Division II First Round	
West Georgia:		28–7	23–4			
Florida Atlantic Owls (Conference USA) (2019)
2019	Florida Atlantic	1–0 (Note: Lane Kiffin resigned after the Conference USA Championship Game to become head coach at Ole Miss. Spencer served as the team's head coach during their bowl game.)	0–0		W Boca Raton	
Florida Atlantic:		1–0	0–0			
Total:		29–7				
National championship Conference title Conference division title or championship game berth
