= Joe Okafor =

American football player (born 1991)

No. 61
- Position: Nose tackle

Personal information
- Born: June 5, 1991 (age 35); Bellaire, Texas, U.S.
- Listed height: 6 ft 6 in (1.98 m)
- Listed weight: 304 lb (138 kg)

Career information
- High school: Bellaire (Bellaire, Texas)
- College: Oklahoma State (2011); Lamar (2012–2014)
- NFL draft: 2015: undrafted

Career history
- Pittsburgh Steelers (2015)*
- * Offseason or practice squad member only

Joe Okafor // (born June 5, 1991) is an American former football nose tackle. He played college football at Oklahoma State University and Lamar University. He was signed by the Pittsburgh Steelers as an undrafted free agent in 2015.
