= Justin Blackmon =

American football player (born 1990)

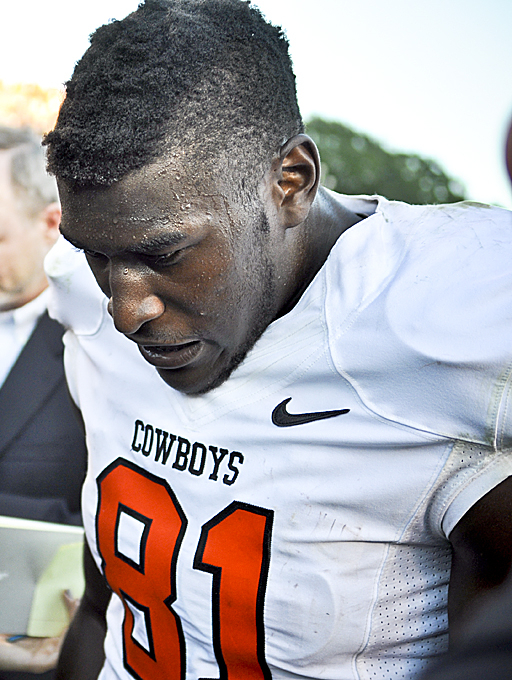
- Blackmon with the Oklahoma State Cowboys in 2011

No. 14
- Position: Wide receiver

Personal information
- Born: January 9, 1990 (age 36); Oceanside, California, U.S.
- Listed height: 6 ft 1 in (1.85 m)
- Listed weight: 210 lb (95 kg)

Career information
- High school: Plainview (Ardmore, Oklahoma)
- College: Oklahoma State (2008–2011)
- NFL draft: 2012: 1st round, 5th overall pick

Career history
- Jacksonville Jaguars (2012–2013) (Note: Blackmon was suspended indefinitely by the NFL in November 2013 and has remained on the Jaguars' reserve/suspended list despite not being officially listed on their roster anymore.)

Awards and highlights
- PFWA All-Rookie Team (2012); 2× Fred Biletnikoff Award (2010, 2011); 2× Paul Warfield Trophy (2010, 2011); 2× Unanimous All-American (2010, 2011); NCAA receiving touchdowns leader (2010); 2× First-team All-Big 12 (2010, 2011); Big 12 Offensive Player of the Year (2010)

Career NFL statistics
- Receptions: 93
- Receiving yards: 1,280
- Receiving touchdowns: 6
- Stats at Pro Football Reference
- College Football Hall of Fame

Justin Carl Blackmon (born January 9, 1990) is an American former professional football player who was a wide receiver for the Jacksonville Jaguars of the National Football League (NFL). He played college football for the Oklahoma State Cowboys, twice earning unanimous All-American honors before being selected by the Jaguars fifth overall in the 2012 NFL draft. With Jacksonville, he was suspended for the first four games of the 2013 season for violating the NFL's substance abuse policy and was suspended indefinitely for another violation later that year and has not played since. Blackmon was inducted into the College Football Hall of Fame in 2024.

== Early life ==
Blackmon was born in Oceanside, California. He attended Plainview High School in Ardmore, Oklahoma, where he was a four-sport star in football, basketball, baseball and track. In football, he earned SuperPrep All-America honors as a senior after receiving 61 passes for 1,547 yards with 14 touchdowns, rushing for 152 rushing yards with two scores and returning four interceptions for touchdowns, leading his team to a 12–1 record. In basketball, he was the conference MVP as a junior.

Blackmon also lettered once in track & field. At the 2008 Oklahoma State T&F Championships, he captured the state title in the long jump with a leap of 7.01 meters (22 ft, 10 in), while also placing second in the high jump event, with a leap of 1.98 meters (6 ft, 6 in). After spending the summer working on his 400-meter dash technique, he was challenged by his coach to run under 50 seconds, and he was clocked at 49.2. Regarded as a three-star recruit by Rivals.com, Blackmon was listed as the No. 91 wide receiver prospect in the class of 2008. Colorado and Missouri were among the programs seeking his signature.

== College career ==
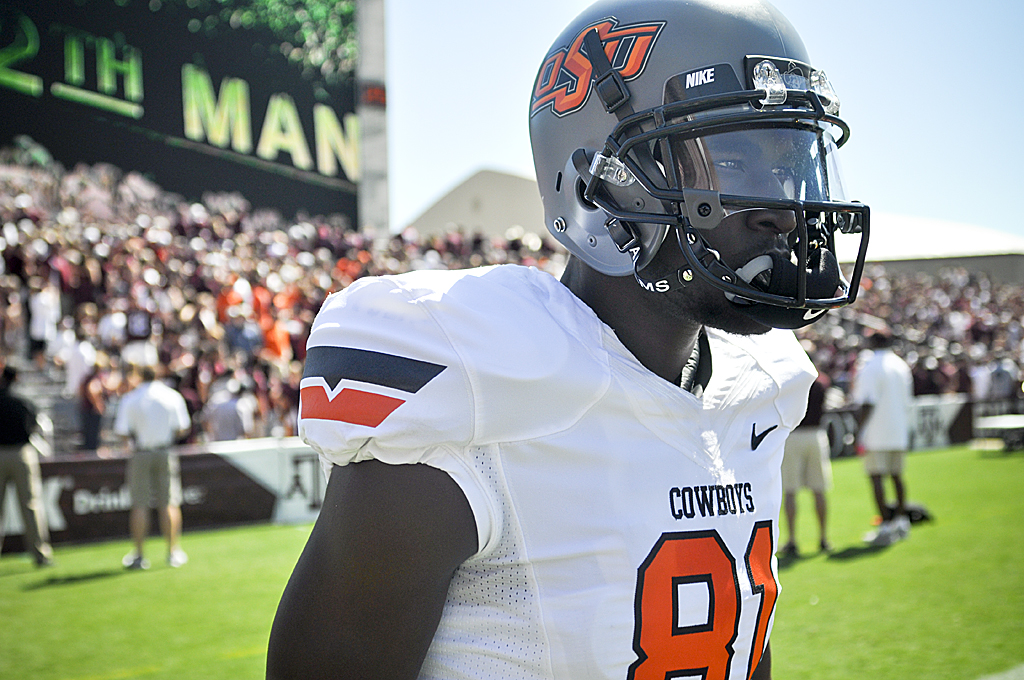
Blackmon with Oklahoma State in 2011

Blackmon received an athletic scholarship to attend Oklahoma State University, where he played for coach Mike Gundy's Oklahoma State Cowboys football team from 2008 to 2011. He was redshirted as a true freshman in 2008, and quickly earned a starting position in 2009. He was named the 2010 Big 12 Offensive Player of the Year, the first receiver to earn the honor. He was awarded the Fred Biletnikoff Award as the nation's top receiver, and was recognized as a unanimous All-American. Blackmon also holds the NCAA records for most consecutive games gaining 100 yards or more and most games gaining 200 yards or more. Statistically, Blackmon caught 111 passes for 1,782 yards and an NCAA-leading 20 touchdowns in 12 games during the 2010 season and also added a pair of scores with a 69-yard run and a blocked punt return.

Blackmon finished the 2011 regular season with 121 catches for 1,522 yards and 18 touchdowns. He led the Big 12 in receiving and ranked second nationally in both receptions per game and total receptions. His 15 touchdown catches led the league and represented the third-highest total in the nation. Following his 2010 sophomore season, he was recognized as a unanimous first-team All-American. Despite the extreme defensive game plans geared specifically at stopping him, he emerged as the Biletnikoff Award winner as the nation's top receiver for the second consecutive season; former Texas Tech receiver Michael Crabtree is the only other player to win the Biletnikoff Award twice. At the 2012 Fiesta Bowl, Blackmon caught 8 passes for 186 yards and 3 touchdowns. After the game, he declared for the 2012 NFL draft. He was also named the 2012 Fiesta Bowl offensive MVP. In 2024, he was inducted into the College Football Hall of Fame.

== Professional career ==
Pre-draft measurables
Height	Weight	Arm length	Hand span	Wingspan	40-yard dash	10-yard split	20-yard split	20-yard shuttle	Three-cone drill	Vertical jump	Broad jump	Bench press
6 ft 0 7/8 in (1.85 m)	207 lb (94 kg)	32 1/2 in (0.83 m)	9 1/4 in (0.23 m)	6 ft 6 1/2 in (1.99 m)	4.46 s	1.53 s	2.60 s	4.38 s	7.13 s	35.0 in (0.89 m)	10 ft 3 in (3.12 m)	14 reps
All values from NFL Combine/Oklahoma State's Pro Day

Blackmon decided not to participate in any workouts at the NFL Combine, instead performing at Oklahoma State's Pro Day. He was considered the best wide receiver in the 2012 NFL draft and predicted to go early in the first round. He had been compared to Anquan Boldin and Terrell Owens. He was drafted by the Jacksonville Jaguars with the fifth pick in the first round of the draft. Jacksonville traded up with the Tampa Bay Buccaneers to draft him, exchanging their number seven selection and a fourth round pick for Tampa Bay's spot. Blackmon was the highest drafted player from Oklahoma State since Barry Sanders in 1989.

Blackmon scored his first career touchdown on November 4, 2012, against the Detroit Lions. On November 18, in a game against the Houston Texans, Blackmon had seven receptions for 236 yards. The 236 yards were third-most for an NFL rookie, (currently the fourth-most), the most since Jerry Rice had 241 in his rookie season of 1985, 27 years previously; as well as the second-most in a game in Jaguars franchise history, trailing only 291 yards by Jimmy Smith in a September 2000 game at the Baltimore Ravens. Blackmon combined with Andre Johnson (273 yards on 14 receptions) to have the most receiving yards in a game by two players on different teams. Blackmon finished his 2012 season with 64 receptions and 865 yards receiving, both of which led all NFL rookies. Blackmon also led all rookie receivers in first downs. His 81-yard touchdown reception against Houston was the longest pass completion to any rookie. He was named to the PFWA All-Rookie Team.

=== Legal issues and suspension ===
On June 3, 2012, Blackmon was arrested for driving under the influence (DUI) of alcohol in Stillwater, Oklahoma and was released from custody later that day. On April 20, 2013, Blackmon received a four-game suspension by the NFL for violating the league's substance abuse policy. In July, he underwent groin surgery. The Jaguars placed him on the physically unable to perform (PUP) list in which he missed training camp and the start of the preseason. Blackmon returned to the active roster and practiced on August 12, however he missed the first four games of the regular season due to his suspension. In his first game back, he caught 5 passes for 136 yards and a touchdown. In his next game, against the Denver Broncos, he recorded 14 catches for 190 yards. On November 1, during the Jaguars' bye week, he was suspended indefinitely without pay for again violating the NFL's Policy and Program for Substances of Abuse. He would have been eligible to apply for reinstatement prior to the 2014 season.

On May 2, 2014, Jaguars general manager David Caldwell announced that it was unlikely that Blackmon would join the team for the 2014 season. Blackmon was arrested following a traffic stop on July 23, 2014, in Edmond, Oklahoma for possession of marijuana. On October 1, 2014, Jaguars head coach Gus Bradley said Blackmon had voluntarily checked into a 90-day program, adding that he had completed nearly half of his commitment, was doing very well and learning a lot. On May 10, 2015, Blackmon was reportedly denied reinstatement by the NFL, effectively ending his 2015 season. In August 2015, Caldwell said that the Jaguars did not expect Blackmon to play for them again, adding that the team had not heard from him for some time. That same month Blackmon was added to the Toronto Argonauts' "confidential" negotiating list before the NFL disallowed it due to his suspension.

On December 19, 2015, Blackmon was arrested for DUI in his hometown of Ardmore, Oklahoma. He pleaded guilty to DUI, and in August 2016 was sentenced to one year in jail, which was suspended pending the completion of one year of probation. He was also fined $1,000 and ordered to undergo 100 hours of community service. If he ever decided to play again, he would have to go through a two-month vetting process after applying for reinstatement. Despite this, Caldwell said at the time of Blackmon's arrest that the Jaguars had no intention of releasing him. Blackmon reportedly completed the terms of his probation in August 2017.

On April 19, 2025, Blackmon was arrested for public intoxication after being found passed out on the steps of Oklahoma State University's Edmon Low Library. Blackmon was determined to be heavily intoxicated and also unable to answer police questions before being arrested.

== Career statistics ==
=== NFL ===
NFL statistics
	Games		Receiving					Rushing					Fumbles		
	Season	GP	GS	Rec	Yds	Avg	Lng	TD	Att	Yds	Avg	Lng	TD	Fum	Lost
2012	16	14	64	865	13.5	81	5	2	23	11.5	12	0	1	0	
2013	4	4	29	415	14.3	67	1	1	-1	-1	-1	0	--	--	
Career	20	18	93	1,280	13.8	81	6	3	22	7.3	12	0	1	0	

=== College ===
Legend
	Led the NCAA
**Bold**	Career high

Year	Team	GP	Receiving		
Year	Team	GP	Rec	Yards	TDs
2009	OSU	13	20	260	2
2010	OSU	12	111	**1,782**	**20**
2011	OSU	13	**122**	1,522	18
**Career**		**38**	**253**	**3,564**	**40**

== See also ==
- List of NCAA major college football yearly receiving leaders
- List of NCAA Division I FBS career receiving touchdowns leaders
