= 1977 Oklahoma Sooners football team =

American college football season

1977 Oklahoma Sooners football
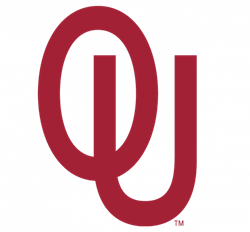

Big 8 champion

Orange Bowl, L 6–31 vs. Arkansas
- Conference: Big Eight Conference

Ranking
- Coaches: No. 6
- AP: No. 7
- Record: 10–2 (7–0 Big 8)
- Head coach: Barry Switzer (5th season)
- Offensive coordinator: Galen Hall (5th season)
- Offensive scheme: Wishbone
- Defensive coordinator: Larry Lacewell (8th season)
- Base defense: 5–2
- Captains: Karl Baldischwiler; Zac Henderson; Elvis Peacock
- Home stadium: Oklahoma Memorial Stadium

1977 Big Eight Conference football standings
	Conf.					Overall
Team	W		L		T	W		L		T
No. 7 Oklahoma $	7	–	0	–	0	10	–	2	–	0
Iowa State	5	–	2	–	0	8	–	4	–	0
No. 12 Nebraska	5	–	2	–	0	9	–	3	–	0
Colorado	3	–	3	–	1	7	–	3	–	1
Missouri	3	–	4	–	0	4	–	7	–	0
Kansas	2	–	4	–	1	4	–	6	–	1
Oklahoma State	2	–	5	–	0	4	–	7	–	0
Kansas State	0	–	7	–	0	2	–	9	–	0
$ – Conference champion; Rankings from AP Poll

The 1977 Oklahoma Sooners football team represented the University of Oklahoma in the 1977 NCAA Division I football season. Oklahoma was a member of the Big Eight Conference and played its home games in Oklahoma Memorial Stadium, where it has played its home games since 1923. The team posted a 10–2 overall record and a 7–0 conference record to earn the Conference title under head coach Barry Switzer who took the helm in 1973. This was Switzer's fifth conference title and third undefeated conference record in five seasons.

The team was led by All-Americans George Cumby, Daryl Hunt, Reggie Kinlaw, and Zac Henderson Cumby was named Big Eight Defensive Player of the Year. After winning the conference title outright, it earned a trip to the Orange Bowl where it lost to the Arkansas Razorbacks. During the season, it faced five ranked opponents (In order, No. 4 Ohio State, No. 5 Texas, No. 16 Iowa State, No. 11 Nebraska, and No. 6 Arkansas). Four of its opponents ended the season ranked. It endured its only regular season defeat in the Red River Shootout against Texas. The Sooners started the season with a four consecutive wins before losing to Texas and then won the next six before their unsuccessful bowl game.

Elvis Peacock led the team in rushing with 812 yards, Dean Blevins led the team in passing with 385 yards, Steve Rhodes led the team in receiving with 272 yards, Uwe von Schamann led the team in scoring with 89 points, Hunt led the team in tackles with 159 tackles and Henderson posted 7 interceptions.

== Schedule ==
Date	Opponent	Rank	Site	TV	Result	Attendance	Source
September 10	Vanderbilt*	No. 1	Oklahoma Memorial Stadium; Norman, OK		W 25–23	71,184	
September 17	Utah*	No. 5	Oklahoma Memorial Stadium; Norman, OK		W 62–24	71,184	
September 24	at No. 4 Ohio State*	No. 3	Ohio Stadium; Columbus, OH	ABC	W 29–28	88,119	
October 1	Kansas	No. 1	Oklahoma Memorial Stadium; Norman, OK		W 24–9	71,184	
October 8	vs. No. 5 Texas*	No. 2	Cotton Bowl; Dallas, TX (Red River Shootout)		L 6–13	72,032	
October 15	at Missouri	No. 7	Faurot Field; Columbia, MO (rivalry)		W 21–17	63,774	
October 22	No. 16 Iowa State	No. 6	Oklahoma Memorial Stadium; Norman, OK		W 35–16	71,184	
October 29	at Kansas State	No. 4	KSU Stadium; Manhattan, KS		W 42–7	25,600	
November 5	at Oklahoma State	No. 3	Lewis Field; Stillwater, OK (Bedlam Series)		W 61–28	50,088	
November 12	Colorado	No. 3	Oklahoma Memorial Stadium; Norman, OK	ABC	W 52–14	71,184	
November 25	No. 11 Nebraska^{†}	No. 3	Oklahoma Memorial Stadium; Norman, OK (rivalry)	ABC	W 38–7	71,184	
January 1, 1978	vs. No. 6 Arkansas*	No. 2	Miami Orange Bowl; Miami, FL (Orange Bowl)	NBC	L 6–31	60,987	
*Non-conference game; ^{†}Homecoming; Rankings from AP Poll released prior to the game

== Rankings ==
Ranking movements Legend: ██ Increase in ranking ██ Decrease in ranking
	Week													
Poll	Pre	1	2	3	4	5	6	7	8	9	10	11	12	Final
AP	1	5	3	1	2	7	6	4	3	3	3	3	2	7
Coaches Poll	Not released	6	4	2	3	6	6	3	3	3	2	2	2	6

== Game summaries ==
=== Vanderbilt ===
Team	1	2	3	4	Total
Vanderbilt	5	10	0	8	23
• Oklahoma	0	11	0	14	25

- Date: September 10
- Location: Oklahoma Memorial Stadium
- Game attendance: 71,184

=== Utah ===
Team	1	2	3	4	Total
Utah	0	17	0	7	24
• Oklahoma	31	10	7	14	62

- Date: September 17
- Location: Oklahoma Memorial Stadium
- Game attendance: 71,184

=== At Ohio State ===
#3 Oklahoma Sooners (2–0) at #4 Ohio State Buckeyes (2–0)

Quarter	1	2	3	4	Total
Oklahoma	17	3	0	9	29
Ohio State	0	14	14	0	28

at Ohio Stadium, Columbus, Ohio

- Date: September 29
- Game time: 1:55 p.m.
- Game weather: Overcast, 78 °F (26 °C)
- Game attendance: 88,119
- Referee: Gene Calhoun (Big Ten)
- TV announcers (ABC): Keith Jackson and Ara Parseghian

Game information

First quarter

- OKLA – Elvis Peacock 33-yard run (Uwe von Schamann kick), 11:59. Oklahoma 7–0. Drive: 6 plays, 61 yards, 2:09.
- OKLA – Billy Sims 14-yard run (Uwe von Schamann kick), 11:05. Oklahoma 14–0. Drive: 2 plays, 16 yards, 0:45.
- OKLA – Uwe von Schamann 23-yard field goal, 3:29. Oklahoma 17–0. Drive: 12 plays, 60 yards, 6:08.

Second quarter

- OKLA – Uwe von Schamann 33-yard field goal, 12:58. Oklahoma 20–0. Drive: 9 plays, 45 yards, 3:31.
- OSU – Ron Springs 30-yard run (Vlade Janakievski kick), 10:32. Oklahoma 20–7. Drive: 7 plays, 80 yards, 2:23.
- OSU – Rod Gerald 19-yard run (Vlade Janakievski kick), 9:46. Oklahoma 20–14. Drive: 1 play, 19 yards, 0:06.

Third quarter

- OSU – Joel Payton 1-yard run (Vlade Janakievski kick), 8:04. Ohio State 21–20. Drive: 7 plays, 48 yards, 3:51.
- OSU – Jimmy Moore 16-yard pass from Greg Castignola (Vlade Janakievski kick), 4:44. Ohio State 28–20. Drive: 5 plays, 33 yards, 2:01.

Fourth quarter

- OKLA – Elvis Peacock 1-yard run (run failed), 1:29. Ohio State 28–26. Drive: 12 plays, 57 yards, 4:55.
- OKLA – Uwe von Schamann 41-yard field goal, 0:03. Oklahoma 29–28. Drive: 5 plays, 50 yards, 1:18.

Top passers

- OKLA – Dean Blevins – 3/5, 44 yards, 2 INT
- OSU – Greg Castignola – 2/2, 29 yards, TD

Top rushers

- OKLA – Billy Sims – 11 rushes, 60 yards, TD
- OSU – Ron Springs – 14 rushes, 64 yards, TD

Top receivers

- OKLA – Steve Rhodes – 3 receptions, 44 yards
- OSU – Jimmy Moore – 1 reception, 16 yards, TD

"The Kick" - Uwe von Schamann pretended to conduct the crowd as they chanted prior to his field goal attempt

=== Kansas ===
Team	1	2	3	4	Total
Kansas	0	0	0	9	9
• Oklahoma	0	7	17	0	24

- Date: October 1
- Location: Oklahoma Memorial Stadium
- Game attendance: 71,184

=== Texas ===
Team	1	2	3	4	Total
Oklahoma	3	0	3	0	6
• Texas	0	10	0	3	13

- Date: October 8
- Location: Cotton Bowl
- Game attendance: 72,032

=== Missouri ===
Team	1	2	3	4	Total
• Oklahoma	0	7	14	0	21
Missouri	0	10	0	7	17

- Date: October 15
- Location: Faurot Field
- Game attendance: 63,774

Scoring summary
Q2	MU	Bess 16 yard interception return (Brockhaus kick)	MU 7–0
Q2	MU	Brockhaus 36 yard field goal	MU 10–0
Q2	OU	Hicks 14 yard pass from Lott (von Schamann kick)	MU 10–7
Q3	OU	Peacock 35 yard run (von Schamann kick)	OU 14–10
Q3	OU	Lott 1 yard run (von Schamann kick)	OU 21–10
Q4	MU	Winslow 2 yard pass from Woods (Brockhaus kick)	OU 21–17

=== Iowa State ===
Team	1	2	3	4	Total
Iowa St	9	0	7	0	16
• Oklahoma	7	7	7	14	35

- Date: October 22
- Location: Oklahoma Memorial Stadium
- Game attendance: 71,184

=== Kansas State ===
Team	1	2	3	4	Total
• Oklahoma	14	7	14	7	42
Kansas St	0	0	0	7	7

- Date: October 29
- Location: KSU Stadium
- Game attendance: 25,600

=== Oklahoma State ===
Team	1	2	3	4	Total
• Oklahoma	10	11	24	16	61
Oklahoma St	14	0	14	0	28

- Date: November 5
- Location: Lewis Field
- Game attendance: 50,088

Scoring summary
1	OKST	Miller 2 yard run (Ankerson kick)	Okla St 7–0
1	OKLA	Peacock 48 yard pass from Lott (von Schamann kick)	Tie 7–7
1	OKST	Miller 71 yard run (Ankerson kick)	Okla St 14–7
1	OKLA	von Schamann 58 yard field goal	Okla St 14–10
2	OKLA	von Schamann 22 yard field goal	Okla St 14–13
2	OKLA	Overstreet 1 yard run (Lott run)	Oklahoma 21–14
3	OKST	Bailey 1 yard run (Ankerson kick)	Tie 21–21
3	OKST	Miller 3 yard run (Ankerson kick)	Okla St 28–21
3	OKLA	Lott 80 yard run (von Schamann kick)	Tie 28–28
3	OKLA	Overstreet 43 yard run (von Schamann kick)	Oklahoma 35–28
3	OKLA	Hicks 10 yard pass from Blevins (von Schamann kick)	Oklahoma 42–28
3	OKLA	von Schamann 19 yard field goal	Oklahoma 45–28
4	OKLA	Peacock 57 yard run (von Schamann kick)	Oklahoma 52–28
4	OKLA	Nixon 3 yard run (von Schamann kick)	Oklahoma 59–28
4	OKLA	Safety, Scott tackled in end zone	Oklahoma 61–28

=== Colorado ===
Colorado at #3 Oklahoma

Team	1	2	3	4	Total
Colorado	0	7	0	7	14
• Oklahoma	14	21	10	7	52

- Date: November 12
- Location: Oklahoma Memorial Stadium
- Game attendance: 71,184
- TV announcers (ABC): Keith Jackson and Frank Broyles

Scoring summary
1	OU	Elvis Peacock 3-yard run (Uwe von Schamann kick)	OU 7-0
1	OU	Billy Sims 1-yard run (Uwe von Schamann kick)	OU 14-0
2	OU	Billy Sims 2-yard run (Uwe von Schamann kick)	OU 21-0
2	OU	Thomas Lott 6-yard run (Uwe von Schamann kick)	OU 28-0
2	OU	Steve Rhodes 28-yard pass from Thomas Lott (Uwe von Schamann kick)	OU 35-0
2	COL	James Mayberry 3-yard run (Pete Dadiotis kick)	OU 35-7
3	OU	Uwe von Schamann 36-yard field goal	OU 38-7
3	OU	Billy Sims 16-yard run (Uwe von Schamann kick)	OU 45-7
4	OU	Jeff Williams 15-yard run (Uwe von Schamann kick)	OU 52-7
4	COL	Bob Humble 1-yard run (Pete Dadiotis kick)	OU 52-14

=== Nebraska ===
Team	1	2	3	4	Total
Nebraska	0	7	0	0	7
• Oklahoma	0	21	3	14	38

- Date: November 25
- Location: Oklahoma Memorial Stadium
- Referee: Dan Foley (Big 8)
- TV announcers (ABC): Bill Flemming and Rick Forzano

=== Orange Bowl ===
Team	1	2	3	4	Total
• Arkansas	14	0	10	7	31
Oklahoma	0	0	0	6	6

- Date: January 2, 1978
- Location: Orange Bowl, Miami
- Game attendance: 60,987
- Referee: R. Pete Williams
- TV announcers (NBC): Jim Simpson and Merlin Olsen

Scoring summary
1	ARK	Sales 1-yard run (Little kick)	Arkansas 7–0
1	ARK	Calcagni 1-yard run (Little kick)	Arkansas 14–0
3	ARK	Little 32-yard FG	Arkansas 17-0
3	ARK	Sales 4-yard run (Little kick)	Arkansas 24-0
4	OKLA	Hicks 8-yard pass from Blevins (PAT failed)	Arkansas 24–6
4	ARK	White 20-yard run (Little kick)	Arkansas 31–6

== Personnel ==
1977 Oklahoma Sooners football team roster
Players
Coaches
Offense

Pos.	#	Name	Class
HB	43	Vickey Ray Anderson	Jr
OT	67	Karl Baldischwiler	Sr
QB	2	Dean Blevins	Sr
OT	63	Sam Claphan	Jr
G	75	Terry Crouch	Fr
TE	80	Victor Hicks	Jr
WR	21	Bobby Kimball	Jr
RB	30	Kenny King	Jr
QB	6	Thomas Lott	Jr
WR	11	Fred Nixon	Fr
OT	66	Louis Oubre	So
HB	22	David Overstreet	Fr
RB	4	Elvis Peacock	Sr
SE	24	Steve Rhodes	So
G	65	Greg Roberts	Jr
RB	34	Jimmy Rogers	Jr
RB	20	Billy Sims	So
C	51	Mike Spencer	Sr
OT	73	Paul Tabor	Jr
OL	61	Jeff Ward	Jr
QB	1	J. C. Watts	So

Defense

Pos.	#	Name	Class
LB	28	George Cumby	So
DT	72	John Goodman	Fr
DE	90	Rusty Griffis	Jr
DB	33	Bud Hebert	Jr
S	19	Zac Henderson	Sr
DT	70	Dave Hudgens	Sr
LB	85	Daryl Hunt	Jr
DE	83	Mike Joyce	So
DT	62	Reggie Kinlaw	Jr
DE	58	Reggie Mathis	Jr
DB	3	Darrol Ray	So
DE	41	Mike Rilley	Fr
DT	74	Phil Tabor	Jr
DT	96	Richard Turner	Fr

Special teams

Pos.	#	Name	Class
K	10	Uwe von Schamann	Jr

Head coach

- Barry Switzer

Coordinators/assistant coaches

- Donnie Duncan (assistant)
- Gary Gibbs (GA)
- Galen Hall (OC)
- Warren Harper (LB)
- Gene Hochevar
- Larry Lacewell (DC)
- Rex Norris (DL)
- Gerald O'Dell
- Jerry Pettibone
- Lucious Selmon (DL)

Legend

- (C) Team captain
- (S) Suspended
- (I) Ineligible
- Injured
- Redshirt

Roster

== Awards and honors ==
- All-American: George Cumby, Daryl Hunt, Reggie Kinlaw, and Zac Henderson
- Big 8 Defensive Player of the Year: Cumby

== NFL draft ==
The following players were drafted into the National Football League following the season.

Round	Pick	Player	Position	NFL team
1	20	Elvis Peacock	Running back	Los Angeles Rams
3	84	Dave Hudgens	Tackle	Dallas Cowboys
7	178	Karl Baldischwiler	Tackle	Miami Dolphins
11	289	Richard Murray	Defensive tackle	Detroit Lions
