= Hudgens =

Hudgens is a surname. Notable people with the surname include:

- Christopher Hudgens (born 1977), American artist
- Dave Hudgens (born 1956), American baseball player and coach
- Dave Hudgens (American football) (born 1955), American football player
- John E. Hudgens (born 1967), American film maker
- Ralph Hudgens (born 1942), American politician
- Vanessa Hudgens (born 1988), American actress and singer
