= History of Iowa State Cyclones football =

The Iowa State Cyclones football team represents Iowa State University in American football.

== Overview ==
=== Early history (1892–1967) ===
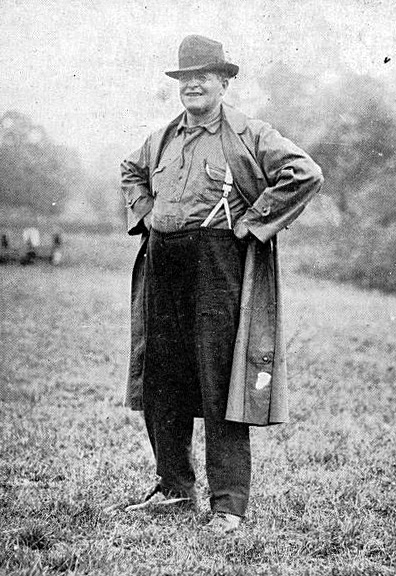
Pop Warner co-coached Iowa State's earliest football teams

Football was first played on the Iowa State campus in 1878 as a recreational sport, but it wasn't until 1892 that an organized team first represented Iowa State in football. In 1894, college president William M. Beardshear spearheaded the foundation of an athletic association to officially sanction Iowa State football teams. The 1894 team finished with a 6–1 mark, including a 16–8 victory over what is now the University of Iowa. One of the pioneers of football, Pop Warner, spent time at Iowa State early in his career. In 1895, despite already being the coach at Georgia he was offered $25 per week to come to Iowa State, whose season started in mid-August while Georgia's started a month later, as well as provide weekly advice during the rest of the season. Soon after Warner left for Georgia, Iowa State had its first game of the season. Iowa State came into Evanston as the underdog, but defeated Northwestern 36–0. A Chicago sportswriter called the team "cornfed giants from Iowa" while the Chicago Tribune's headline read, "Struck by a Cyclone". Since then, Iowa State teams have been known as the Cyclones. Overall, the team had three wins and three losses and, like Georgia, Iowa State retained Warner for the next season. In 1896 the team had eight wins and two losses. Despite leaving Cornell in 1898, Warner remained as the head coach of Iowa State for another year. During his last three years at Iowa State the team had a winning season but Warner was unable to match his 1896 triumph. After playing at Iowa and then serving as an assistant coach for two years, Clyde Williams came to Ames as an assistant coach for ISU. Williams served as the Cyclones' head football coach for six seasons from 1907 to 1912. During that time, he had a coaching record of 32–15–2. This ranks him fifth at Iowa State in total wins and fourth at Iowa State in winning percentage. In addition, he led Iowa State to two Missouri Valley Conference football titles in 1911 and 1912, which are currently the only two conference football championships in school history. In addition to his football contributions, Williams was the school's first men's basketball coach from 1908 to 1911, where he compiled a 20–29 record. He also served as Iowa State's baseball coach, and was their athletic director from 1914 to 1919. In 1914, Iowa State completed construction of their new football field and it was named Clyde Williams Field in honor of the former coach. Williams was inducted into the State of Iowa Hall of Fame in 1956. He is also one of the few people inducted into both the University of Iowa Athletics Hall of Fame (inducted 1993) and the Iowa State athletics Hall of Fame (inducted 1997). The early success of Iowa State football was not repeated for most of the mid-20th century. In 1922 after having two different head coaches in two years, ISU hired up-and-comer Sam Willaman away from East Technical HS in Cleveland, OH. When Willaman came to Iowa state, he brought with him six of his former East Tech players, including an African-American, Jack Trice. Trice was the first African-American player at Iowa State, and one of the first to play football in the mid-west. Trice suffered a severe malicious injury during a game at Minnesota in 1923, and died from complications. In 1997, Iowa State's Cyclone Stadium was renamed Jack Trice Stadium in his honor. In his first season, Willaman's team finished with a 2–6 record, but posted a winning record in each of the three years that followed. His career coaching record at Iowa state was 14–15–3. This ranks him 16th in total wins and 13th in winning percentage in Iowa State football history.

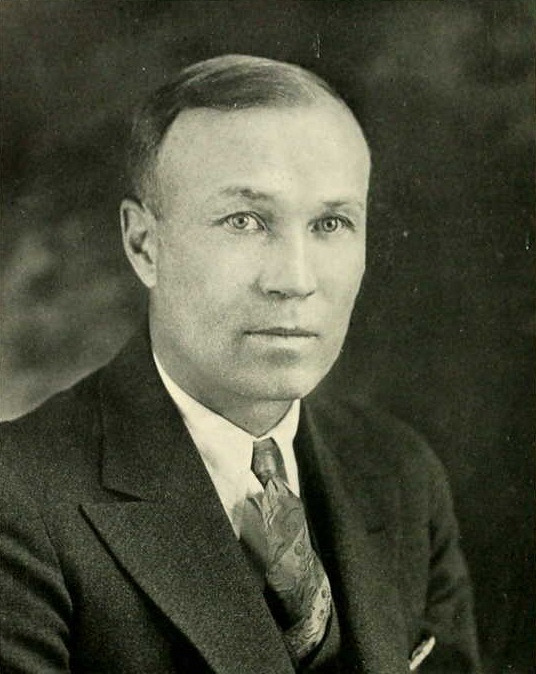
George F. Veenker went 21–22 during his coaching career at Iowa State

In February 1931, George F. Veenker accepted an offer to become the head football coach for Iowa State. Under Veenker Iowa State experienced a brief period of success. When Veenker joined Iowa State, the school's football team was coming off a winless season in 1930 and had lost 16 consecutive games dating back to October 1929. In his first year, the 1931 team defeated Missouri 20–0, Oklahoma 13–12, and Kansas State 7–6, compiled a 5–3 record and finished in second place in the Big Six. In November 1931, the Ames Daily Tribune-Times called Veenker "a veritable miracle man of football" for taking a school where "Cyclone football morale couldn't have been lower" and turning the program around in his first season. The highlight of Veenker's career as Iowa State's football coach was a 31–6 victory over the Iowa Hawkeyes in 1934. The game was the last meeting between the two schools until 1977. Veenker resigned in 1936, his overall record was 21–22–8. Shortly after his death in 1959 the university owned golf course was renamed Veenker Memorial Golf Course in his honor. During the 1938 season, James J. Yeager was in his second year as head coach. Despite going 3–6 in 1937, the Cyclones would go onto a then-best record of 7–1–1. The team was led by the outstanding senior guard, Ed Bock. At the conclusion of the season Bock became the first consensus first team All-American in ISU history. Bock was inducted into the College Football Hall of Fame in 1970. In 1942 Iowa State hired former Green Bay Packers All-Pro guard and three time NFL champion Mike Michalske to be the new head coach. Michalske achieved a moderate level of success while at Iowa State, finishing with an 18–18 record after five seasons.

=== Johnny Majors era (1968–1972) ===
In 1968 in an attempt to turn the team around, Iowa State hired former standout Tennessee running back and up-and-comer Arkansas assistant as the 24th head coach in program history. The Cyclones finished 3–7 in his first two seasons, but in 1970 the team tied for 6th in the Big Eight and had a final record of 5–6.

==== 1971 Sun Bowl ====
The 1971 team was picked to finish last in the Big Eight, but overcame the odds to finish 4–3 in the conference and 8–4 overall. The team was led by junior running back George Amundson, whom Majors called "the finest athlete I have coached in any job I have had." Iowa State had one defensive all-conference pick, LB Keith Schroeder. Offensively they were led by Amundson who rushed for 1,260 yards as a running back, including a then school record of 15 touchdowns. End Keith Krepfle had 40 receptions for 570 yards and 12 touchdowns. Quarterback Dean Carlson threw for a then school record of 1,867 yards. These efforts were enough to receive a bid to the 1971 Sun Bowl, this was the first bowl game in program history. Iowa State was slated to play against LSU on December 18, 1971.

LSU opened the game with two early Jay Michaelson field goals, but Iowa State responded with a field goal of their own to make it 6–3. The Tigers had the ball at the ISU 4 late in the half, but they turned it over on downs just before half soon ended. In the second half, LSU broke the game open. Bert Jones threw two touchdown passes in the third quarter, one to Andy Hamilton from 37 yards out, and one to Gerald Keigley from 21 yards out to make it 19–3. Iowa State responded late in the quarter with a Dean Carlson 30-yard touchdown pass to Larry Marquardt to make it 19–9. In the fourth, Carlson threw a 1-yard pass to Keith Krepfle to make it 19–15 early in the fourth. Jones responded with his third touchdown pass, this time to Michaelson, to make it 26–15. Jay Michaelson. With 3:00 remaining, Jones ran for a touchdown to make it 33–15. Iowa State wasn't able to mount a comeback and the Tigers won the game. Matt Blair was named the defensive MVP for the game.

1971 Sun Bowl: Iowa State Cyclones vs. LSU Tigers; Game Summary

Quarter	1	2	3	4	Total
Tigers	6	0	13	14	33
Cyclones	0	3	6	6	15

at Sun Bowl, El Paso, TX

- Date: December 18
- Game attendance: 33,503
- TV announcers (CBS): Lindsey Nelson (Play-by-play) & Pat Summerall (Color)

==== 1972 Liberty Bowl ====
1972 saw the loss of five starters and the move of George Amundson from running back to quarterback to replace Dean Carlson. The Clones lost linebacker Matt Blair to a pre season injury which forced him into a medical redshirt. The Cyclones tied Nebraska 23–23 on a missed extra point by Iowa State's Tom Goedjen. Three players went on to be named to the first team All-Big Eight team as well be honored as All-Americans, offensive lineman Geary Murdoch, defensive end Merv Krakau and quarterback George Amundson. George Amundson was named Big Eight player of the year over Heisman Trophy winner, Johnny Rodgers. It was in this year that Iowa State became known as D-Tackle U, similar to Penn State's moniker "Linebacker U". Iowa State's 5–6–1 record was enough to earn them an invitation to the 1972 Liberty Bowl against Georgia Tech.

Iowa State led 14–3 after the first quarter and a Willie Jones Liberty Bowl record, 93-yard kickoff return gave the Cyclones a 21–17 halftime edge. Georgia Tech regained the lead, but the Cyclones took advantage of a Tech turnover late in the game. Amundson hit Ike Harris on a 5-yard TD pass with 1:36 left to cut the Tech lead to 31–30, but Amundson's two-point conversion pass fell incomplete to end the Cyclones’ chances for victory.

1972 Liberty Bowl: Iowa State Cyclones vs. Georgia Tech Yellow Jackets; Game Summary

Quarter	1	2	3	4	Total
Yellow Jackets	3	14	7	7	31
Cyclones	14	7	3	6	30

at Liberty Bowl Memorial Stadium, Memphis, TN

- Date: December 18
- Game attendance: 50,021
- TV: (ABC)

Game information

First quarter

- GT – 13:55 Bonifay 32 yd field goal good (GT 3–0)
- ISU – 09:40 Harris 19 yd pass from Amundson, Goedjen XP good (ISU 7–3)
- ISU – 03:29 Moore 1 yd run, Goedjen XP good (ISU 14–3)

Second quarter

- GT – 08:15 Robinson 9 yd pass from Stevens, Bonifay XP failed (ISU 14–9)
- GT – 01:46 Faulkner 19 yd interception return, Stevens 2 point conversion good (GT 17–14)
- ISU – 01:23 Jones 93 yd kickoff return good, Goedjen XP good (ISU 21–17)

Third quarter

- GT – 07:08 Healy 22 yd pass from Stevens, Thigpen XP good (GT 24–21)
- ISU – 01:40 Goedjen 30 yd field goal good (ISU 24–23)

Fourth quarter

- GT – 11:28 McNamara 3 yd pass from Stevens, Thigpen XP good (GT 31–23)
- ISU – 01:36 Harris 5 yd pass from Amundson, 2 point conversion failed (GT 31–30)

Top passers

- GT – Jim Stevens 12/15, 157 yards, 3 TD, 1 INT
- ISU – George Amundson 10/19, 153 yards, 2 TD, 2 INT

Top rushers

- GT – Southall 22 attempts, 48 yards
- ISU – Amundson 13 attempts, 78 yards, 1 TD

Top receivers

- GT – Healy 2 receptions, 41 yards, 1 TD
- ISU – Harris 4 receptions, 46 yards, 2 TD

At the conclusion of the 1972 season Majors announced he would be leaving Iowa State to take the head coaching job at Pittsburgh.

==== All-Americans under Johnny Majors ====
All-Americans
Player	Position	Year
George Amundson	QB	1972
Merv Krakau	DE	1972
Geary Murdock	OL	1972

==== Record under Johnny Majors ====
Record
Year	1968	1969	1970	1971	1972
Record	3–7	3–7	5–6	8–4	5–6–1

=== Earle Bruce era (1973–1978) ===
In order to continue the success experienced under Johnny Majors Iowa State hired Earle Bruce out of Tampa. With new found excitement around ISU football, the university broke ground on a new $7.6 million stadium that would eventually become Jack Trice Stadium. Despite future Minnesota Vikings star linebacker Matt Blair being a first team All-American, the Cyclones struggled to a 4–7 finish in Bruce's inaugural 1973 season. Over the next two seasons the cyclones experienced moderate success but both seasons ended again with 4–7 records. However, Earle Bruce's fourth team blossomed as one of the best teams in school history. En route to their 8–3 final record the Cyclones scored wins against #7 Missouri and #9 Nebraska. Iowa State was ultimately snubbed by the bowls but finished the 1976 season ranked #19 in the AP Poll. Bruce was selected as Big Eight coach of the year.

==== 1977 Peach Bowl ====
Iowa State followed up their strong 1976 campaign with another eight win season. The Cyclones beat #9 Nebraska for the second time in a row and were ranked as high at 16th in the AP Poll at one point during the season. Their 5–2 conference record and 8–4 overall record were good enough for a bid to the 1977 Peach Bowl against North Carolina State.

The Wolfpack opened the game with drive all the way to the ISU one yard line, however Iowa State was able to prevent the touchdown and recover an NC State fumble. The stout ISU defense was not able to hold up and NC State scored three first half touchdowns. Iowa State mounted a fourth quarter come back scoring back to back touchdowns, but it wasn't enough to outscore the Wolfpack. Iowa State lost 14–24.

1977 Peach Bowl: Iowa State Cyclones vs. North Carolina State Wolfpack; Game Summary

Quarter	1	2	3	4	Total
Wolfpack	7	14	0	3	24
Cyclones	0	0	0	14	14

at Atlanta–Fulton County Stadium, Atlanta, GA

- Date: December 31
- Game attendance: 36,733

Game information

First quarter

- NCST – Hall 77 yd pass from Evans, Sherrill XP good (NCST 7–0)

Second quarter

- NCST – Brown 5 yd pass from Evans, Sherrill XP good (NCST 14–0)
- NCST – Evans 32 yd run, Sherrill XP good (NCST 21–0)

Fourth quarter

- ISU – Quinn 1 yd run, Kollman XP good (NCST 21–7)
- NCST – Sherrill 42 yd kick good (NCST 24–7)
- ISU – Meckstroth 10 yd pass from Quinn, Kollman XP good (NCST 24–14)

Top passers

- NCST – Evans 12/21, 202 yards, 2 TD
- ISU – Rubley 10/12, 133 yards

Top rushers

- NCST – Brown 52 attempts, 114 yards
- ISU – Green 29 attempts, 172 yards

Top receivers

- NCST – Brown 7 receptions, 65 yards, 1 TD
- ISU – Cerrato 3 receptions, 64 yards

==== 1978 Hall of Fame Classic ====
The Cyclones returned 14 starters from the 1977 Peach Bowl team including Heisman Trophy candidate, Dexter Green and Outland Trophy hopeful, Mike Stensrud. Iowa State's post season hopes came down to their last game against Colorado which was nationally televised. The game was close throughout, with ISU clinging to a 17–10 halftime lead. The second half was a defensive battle, but the ISU defense came up with big plays down the stretch. Mike Stensrud had 16 stops and caused a fumble to help ISU preserve a 20–16 win over the Buffs. The win earned ISU a bid to the 1978 Hall of Fame Classic against Texas A&M.

Iowa State opened the game with two touchdowns but was unable to convert for extra points on either attempt. The Cyclones were not able to contain future first round NFL draft pick Curtis Dickey who rushed for 278 yards and a touchdown. Iowa State lost 28–12.

1978 Hall of Fame Classic: Iowa State Cyclones vs. Texas A&M Aggies; Game Summary

Quarter	1	2	3	4	Total
Aggies	0	14	0	14	28
Cyclones	0	6	6	0	12

at Legion Field, Birmingham, AB

- Date: December 20
- Game attendance: 41,158

Game information

Second quarter

- ISU – Green 5 yd pass from Grant, XP failed (ISU 6–0)
- A&M – Brothers 1 yd run, Franklin XP good (A&M 7–6)
- A&M – Carter 4 yd pass from Mosley, Franklin XP good (14–6)

Third quarter

- ISU – Green 28 yd run, XP failed (A&M 14–12)

Fourth quarter

- A&M – Dickey 19 yd run, Franklin XP good (A&M 21–12)
- A&M – Armstrong 5 yd run, Franklin XP good (A&M 28–12)

At the conclusion of the 1978 season Bruce announced he would be leaving Iowa State to take the head coaching job at Ohio State.

==== All-Americans under Earle Bruce ====
All-Americans
Player	Position	Year
Matt Blair	LB	1973
Barry Hill	DB	1974
Luther Blue	WR	1976
Ron McFarland	NT	1977
Mike Stensrud	DT	1978

==== Record under Earle Bruce ====
All-Americans
Year	1973	1974	1975	1976	1977	1978
Record	4–7	4–7	4–7	8–3	8–4	8–4

=== Donnie Duncan era (1979–1982) ===
In order to continue the success found under Earle Bruce, Iowa State hired Oklahoma assistant Donnie Duncan. He was the 26th head football coach at ISU and he held that position for four seasons, from 1979 until 1982. His 1980 and 1981 Cyclones squads both made appearances in the national rankings. The 1981 Cyclones began the season at 5–1–1 and rose to No. 11 in the AP Poll. Led by future NFL players Dwayne Crutchfield, Dan Johnson, Karl Nelson and Chris Washington, the Cyclones tied #5 Oklahoma 7–7 and downed #8 Missouri 34–13. However, the success was short-lived, Duncan resigned with a career record of 18–24–2 after the 1982 season.

=== Jim Criner era (1983–1986) ===
Following the 1982 season Iowa State then hired Jim Criner who had won the 1980 NCAA Division I-AA Football Championship as the head coach at Boise State. During his tenure the Cyclones experienced mild success however they were embroiled in controversy. Multiple players were arrested on different charges as well as several NCAA allegations of wrongdoings. Allegations included coaches giving players cash as well as giving recruits rides and meals. His rough tenure came to an end November 12, 1986, when the school announced his firing. Criner's final career record at Iowa State was 17–25–2.

=== Jim Walden era (1987–1994) ===
Jim Walden succeeded Jim Criner at Iowa State, where he compiled a 28–57–3 over eight seasons. ISU had been hit with scholarship reductions by the NCAA, both because of infractions by the previous coach, and an overall reduction in scholarships for Division I-A for the 1988 season. In his first four years as Iowa State's head coach, he had just 57, 61, 63, and 67 scholarship players. Walden had 47 scholarship players on his squad in 1989 that he brought to Lincoln to play Nebraska on October 28, and they lost 17–49.

Walden notably defeated Oklahoma on October 20, 1990. Iowa State would not beat Oklahoma again until 2017, under current Head Coach Matt Campbell. Oklahoma was ranked 16th in the nation at the time. They had narrowly missed an upset the year before, losing in Ames 40–43. His best record with the Cyclones was 6–5 in 1989. After the 1989 season, Walden was offered a head coaching job at the University of Arizona, but he declined the job, citing a number of people at Iowa State telling him it would be "devastating" if he left. In retrospect, Walden said he was "too dumb" to leave. Walden's teams were plagued with injuries, especially at quarterback. In 1991, third-string quarterback Kevin Caldwell started the final five games of the season; he began the season as a tailback. Walden played four quarterbacks in a 41–0 loss to Kansas in 1991. In 1992, Walden installed the triple-option offense and had mixed results. Iowa State lost to in-state rivals Iowa and UNI early in the 1992 season. The loss to UNI was the first loss by Jim Walden to a Division 1AA school. It was also UNI's first victory over the Cyclones since 1900. Iowa State bounced back to shock the seventh ranked Nebraska Cornhuskers at home on November 14, 1992. The victory was even more improbable because Walden was starting his third-string quarterback, Marv Seiler, for the first time. Walden's 1993 squad went 3–8, but with an upset of 18th ranked Kansas State. Walden ended the 1993 campaign with a walk-on quarterback, Jeff St. Clair.

In the spring of 1994, Walden secured star running back Troy Davis out of Miami, Florida. Davis later had consecutive 2,000-yard rushing seasons, but after Walden's departure. After starting the 1994 campaign 0–2, many fans began to criticize his coaching ability. He began his weekly press conference by handing out the records of Dennis Erickson, Johnny Majors, and Earle Bruce while they were at Washington State and Iowa State. He then handed out Iowa State's overall record in football since fielding its first team in 1892, which, at the time, was 423–461–45, a .480 percentage, and compared his record to that one. Walden claimed that he was as good a coach or better than Erickson, Majors, and Bruce. On Thursday, November 3, 1994, after starting the season 0–7–1, Walden informed his team that he would resign at season's end. He was allowed to coach his final three games by the university, but banned from coaching his last game at Colorado because of criticizing the officials after the Kansas State game. Kansas State's Nyle Wiren had body-slammed Walden's quarterback Todd Doxzon into the turf head first. No penalty was called and Walden, with nothing to lose, went off on the officiating after the game: "I've kept quiet too long, but since I'm leaving there's nothing they can do about me. I think the refereeing in this league is atrocious. . . What do you do with bad officials? Do they get fired? You fire bad players and bad coaches. Bad officials get a raise and go fishing." Walden coached his final game on November 12 against the Nebraska in Ames. Iowa State had an 0–8–1 record and Nebraska was undefeated, with a #1 ranking. Unbelievably Walden's Cyclones hung with the Huskers. At the end of the third quarter, Nebraska led by only two points, 14–12. The final quarter proved to be too much for Walden's team, and Nebraska won the game 28–12. The Cyclones finished with a winless 0–10–1 record in 1994. Walden ranks sixth at Iowa State in total wins and 22nd winning percentage.

=== Dan McCarney era (1995–2006) ===
To turn the program around, Iowa State hired Wisconsin defensive coordinator, Dan McCarney. McCarney coached sophomore phenom running back Troy Davis to large success. Davis would go on to break nearly every Iowa State rushing and touchdown records, most that still stand. Troy twice earned unanimous All-American honors and was the first NCAA Division I-A running back to rush for over 2,000 yards in back-to-back seasons, a feat that has yet to be repeated. Davis finished 5th and 2nd in Heisman voting in his 1995 and 1996 campaigns respectively. McCarney would go 10–34 in his first four seasons as the Cyclones head coach.

==== 2000 Insight.com Bowl ====
In McCarney's sixth season the Cyclones were finally able to put together a competitive team. The Cyclones were quarterbacked by Sage Rosenfels. Sage is among many former Cyclones from the 2000 team to make it to the NFL. Others were J. J. Moses, Reggie Hayward, Ennis Haywood, Tony Yelk, Mike Banks, Jordan Carstens, Tyson Smith and James Reed. Despite Iowa State being picked by the media to finish 5th in the Big 12 North Division, the Cyclones finished with a 5–3 conference record and a 9–3 overall record. ISU finished the season ranked #25 and their nine wins were a program best since 1906. They were then invited to play in the Insight.com Bowl against Pittsburgh, Iowa State's first appearance in a bowl game since the 1978 Peach Bowl.

Pitt scored first on a 72-yard touchdown pass from John Turman to Antonio Bryant, taking an early 7–0 lead. Iowa State answered with a 23-yard pass from Sage Rosenfels to Chris Anthony, tying the game at 7, at the end of the 1st quarter. In the second quarter, Joe Woodley scored on a 1-yard touchdown run for ISU making it 13–7. Ennis Haywood added a 3-yard touchdown run making it 20–7. Sage Rosenfels threw his second TD pass of the game, a 9 yarder to Chris Anthony, as Iowa State made it 27–7 at halftime. In the third quarter, Pitt quarterback Rod Rutherford scored on a 2-yard touchdown run, making it 27–14. John Turman later threw a 44-yard touchdown pass to Antonio Bryant making it 27–20. In the fourth quarter, Iowa State's JaMaine Billups scored on a 72-yard punt return, bringing Iowa State to 34–20. Pitt's Nick Lotz kicked a 25-yard field goal, cutting the deficit to 34–23. Kevan Barlow scored on a 3-yard touchdown run, but the 2-point conversion attempt failed, leaving the score at 34–29. Iowa State's Carl Gomez kicked a 41-yard field goal to cap the scoring at 37–29. Sage Rosenfels and Reggie Hayward were named the MVPs of the game. This was Iowa State's first bowl victory in school history after four previous losses. In an interesting side note, Paul Rhoads was the defensive coordinator for Pittsburgh in this game; he would later become the Iowa State head coach.

2000 Insight.com Bowl: Iowa State Cyclones vs. Pittsburgh Panthers; Game Summary

Quarter	1	2	3	4	Total
Panthers	7	0	13	9	29
Cyclones	7	20	0	10	37

at Chase Field, Phoenix, AZ

- Date: December 28
- Game attendance: 41,813
- TV announcers (ESPN): Ron Franklin (Play-by-play) & Mike Gottfried (Color)

Game information

First quarter

- PITT – 06:39 Antonio Bryant 72 td pass from John Turman, Nick Lotz XP good (Pitt 7–0)
- ISU – 10:08 Chris Anthony 23 yd pass from Sage Rosenfels, Carl Gomez XP good ( tied 7–7)

Second quarter

- ISU – 01:12 Joe Woodley 1yd run, two-point conversion failed ( ISU 13–7)
- ISU – 06:57 Ennis Haywood 3yd run, Carl Gomez XP good (ISU 20–7)
- ISU – 11:37 Chris Anthony 9yd pass from Sage Rosenfels, Carl Gomez XP good (ISU 27–7)

Third quarter

- PITT – 06:50 Rod Rutherford 2 yd run, Nick Lotz XP good (ISU 27–14)
- PITT – 12:55 Antonio Bryant 44 yd pass from John Turman, PAT failed (ISU 27–20)

Fourth quarter

- ISU – 00:27 Jamaine Billups 72 yd punt return, Carl Gomez XP good (ISU 34–20)
- PITT – 03:52 Nick Lotz 25 yd field goal good (ISU 34–23)
- PITT – 05:15 Kevan Barlow 3 yd run, two-point conversion failed (ISU 34–29)
- ISU – 10:07 Carl Gomez 41 yd field goal good (ISU 37–29)

Top passers

- PITT – John Turman 20/36, 347 yards, 2 TD, 1 INT
- ISU – Sage Rosenfels 23/34, 308 yards, 2 TD

Top rushers

- PITT – Kevan Barlow 22 attempts, 114 yards, 1 TD
- ISU – Ennis Haywood 21 attempts, 74 yards, 1 TD

Top receivers

- PITT – Antonio Bryant 5 receptions, 155 yards, 2 TD
- ISU – Chris Anthony 5 receptions, 71 yards, 2 TD

==== 2001 Independence Bowl ====
The 2001 season saw the emergence of JUCO transfer Seneca Wallace and star wide receiver Lane Danielson. The dynamic duo led the Cyclones to a last second win over Iowa, a 7–5 overall record, and an invitation to the Independence Bowl against Alabama, their second consecutive bowl game.

Iowa State would put the first points on the board off of a 36-yard Tony Yelk field goal to lead 3–0 in the first quarter. After reaching the 1-yard line on a 33-yard by Lane Danielsen to close the quarter, the Cyclones would score the game's first touchdown on a 1-yard run by Joe Woodley to give State a 10–0 lead. Alabama would respond later in the quarter with an 8-yard touchdown run by Andrew Zow to close the gap to 10–7. Yelk would then miss a 25-yard field goal with 0:26 remaining in the quarter to keep the score 10–7 at the half. Third quarter scoring would be limited to a single, 41-yard Yelk field goal to bring the Cyclones lead to 13–7 going into the fourth. With 5:31 remaining in the contest, Waine Bacon blocked a Yelk punt with the recovery occurring on the Iowa State 29-yard line. Two plays later, Zow hit Terry Jones for a 27-yard touchdown reception, and the extra point gave the Crimson Tide a 14–13 lead. The Cyclones just missed a 47-yard field goal attempt with 0:46 remaining in the fourth, which would have given State the lead and potential victory. Subsequent to the game there was some question about whether or not the field goal was actually good, as it sailed directly over one of the uprights. The Cyclones lost 13–14.

2001 Independence Bowl: Iowa State Cyclones vs. Alabama Crimson Tide; Game Summary

Quarter	1	2	3	4	Total
Crimson Tide	0	7	0	7	14
Cyclones	3	7	3	0	13

at Independence Stadium, Shreveport, LA

- Date: December 27
- Game attendance: 45,627
- TV: ESPN

Game information

First quarter

- ISU – 13:18 Tony Yelk 36 yd field goal good (ISU 3–0)

Second quarter

- ISU – 14:26 Joe Woodley 1 yd run, Tony Yelk XP good ( ISU 9–7)
- BAMA – 09:19 Andrew Zow 8 yd run, Neal Thomas XP good ( ISU 9–7)

Third quarter

- ISU – 01:57 Tony Yelk 41 yd field goal good (ISU 13–7)

Fourth quarter

- ISU – 04:44 Terry Jones 27 yard pass from Andrew Zow, Neal Thomas XP good (Bama 14–13)

Top passers

- BAMA – Andrew Zow 11/19, 119 yards, 1 TD, 1 INT
- ISU – Seneca Wallace 25/42, 284 yards

Top rushers

- BAMA – Ahmaad Galloway 16 attempts, 90 yards
- ISU – Ennis Haywood 20 attempts, 125 yards

Top receivers

- BAMA – Terry Jones 2 receptions, 44 yards, 1 TD
- ISU – Craig Campbell 7 receptions, 109 yards

==== 2002 Humanitarian Bowl ====
Seneca Wallace would lead the Cyclones to a 6–1 start in 2002, including a near-win against the Florida State in the Eddie Robinson Classic in Kansas City, Missouri. Wallace dove towards the goal line at the last second but was ruled out shy of the end zone. During the home game versus Texas Tech, Seneca Wallace scored on a 12-yard touchdown by running an estimated 120 yards backwards, forwards, and sideways on the field. Wallace dodged tackles and received numerous blocks from his offense, including one devastating block made by running back Michael Wagner. The play briefly catapulted Wallace into Heisman Trophy contention and was recognized by ESPN as the "Play of the Week." It has since been recognized as one of the great plays in college football history. The play is known among Iowa State fans simply as "The Run." Ultimately their 7–7 record was enough to receive a bid to the Humanitarian Bowl against Boise State.

Iowa State got on the board first after a 30-yard field goal from Adam Benike, taking a 3–0 lead. In the second quarter, Boise State's Brock Forsey scored from 4 yards out for Boise State to jump ahead 7–3. Seneca Wallace threw a 6-yard touchdown pass to wide receiver Jamaul Montgomery, and Iowa State took a 10–7 lead to halftime. In the third quarter, Brock Forsey gave Boise State the lead again, as he rumbled in from 2 yards out to place the Broncos in front 14–10. Quarterback Ryan Dinwiddie later scored on a 1-yard quarterback sneak to make it 21–10. In the fourth quarter, Brock Forsey added his third touchdown of the game, a 9 yarder, as Boise State built a 27–10 lead, and pulled away from Iowa State. Lane Danielson scored on a four-yard run making it 27–16, but Ryan Dinwiddie threw a 3-yard touchdown pass to Lou Fanucchi to cap the scoring, and give Boise State a 34–16 win.

2002 Humanitarian Bowl: Iowa State Cyclones vs. Boise State Broncos; Game Summary

Quarter	1	2	3	4	Total
Broncos	0	7	14	13	34
Cyclones	3	7	0	6	16

at Albertsons Stadium, Boise, ID

- Date: December 31
- Game attendance: 30,446

Game information

First quarter

- PITT – 06:39 Antonio Bryant 72 td pass from John Turman, Nick Lotz XP good (Pitt 7–0)
- ISU – 10:08 Chris Anthony 23 yd pass from Sage Rosenfels, Carl Gomez XP good ( tied 7–7)

Second quarter

- ISU – 01:12 Joe Woodley 1yd run, two-point conversion failed ( ISU 13–7)
- ISU – 06:57 Ennis Haywood 3yd run, Carl Gomez XP good (ISU 20–7)
- ISU – 11:37 Chris Anthony 9yd pass from Sage Rosenfels, Carl Gomez XP good (ISU 27–7)

Third quarter

- PITT – 06:50 Rod Rutherford 2 yd run, Nick Lotz XP good (ISU 27–14)
- PITT – 12:55 Antonio Bryant 44 yd pass from John Turman, PAT failed (ISU 27–20)

Fourth quarter

- ISU – 00:27 Jamaine Billups 72 yd punt return, Carl Gomez XP good (ISU 34–20)
- PITT – 03:52 Nick Lotz 25 yd field goal good (ISU 34–23)
- PITT – 05:15 Kevan Barlow 3 yd run, two-point conversion failed (ISU 34–29)
- ISU – 10:07 Carl Gomez 41 yd field goal good (ISU 37–29)

Top passers

- PITT – John Turman 20/36, 347 yards, 2 TD, 1 INT
- ISU – Sam B. Richardson 23/34, 308 yards, 2 TD

Top rushers

- PITT – Kevan Barlow 22 attempts, 114 yards, 1 TD
- ISU – Ennis Haywood 21 attempts, 74 yards, 1 TD

Top receivers

- PITT – Antonio Bryant 5 receptions, 155 yards, 2 TD
- ISU – Chris Anthony 5 receptions, 71 yards, 2 TD

==== 2004 Independence Bowl ====
The 2004 season would be much more successful than the disappointing 2–10 2003 for the Cyclones. Redshirt freshman Bret Meyer took over the quarterback spot and paired up with fellow redshirt freshman receiver Todd Blythe to make a lethal combination. The season got off to a slow start opening the season with a 2–4 overall record and a 0–3 record in the conference. McCarney turned the season around by winning the next four games in a row. The Cyclones had a chance to win the Big 12 North Title but fell short after a Missouri defender intercepted a pass intended for Jon Davis in the end zone. The Cyclones would go on to play the Miami RedHawks in the 2004 Independence Bowl.

In the Independence Bowl, Iowa State prevailed for a 17–13 win as freshman quarterback Bret Meyer rolled up 236 yards of total offense. Both Bret Meyer and Stevie Hicks rushed for over 100 yards, an Independence Bowl first. All-Big 12 cornerback Ellis Hobbs iced the win with a 41-yard interception return in the game's final minute. The Cyclones held on to win 17–13.

2004 Independence Bowl: Iowa State Cyclones vs. Miami RedHawks; Game Summary

Quarter	1	2	3	4	Total
RedHawks	0	7	6	0	13
Cyclones	7	3	0	7	17

at Independence Stadium, Shreveport, LA

- Date: December 28
- Game attendance: 43,076
- TV announcers (ESPN): Dave Barnett (Play-by-play), David Norrie (Color) & Bill Curry (Color)

Game information

First quarter

- ISU – 04:25 Stevie Hicks 4 yd run, Bret Culbertson XP good (ISU 7–0)

Second quarter

- ISU – 10:58 Bret Culbertson 22 yd field goal good (ISU 10–0)
- MU – 00:31 Luke Clemens 28 yd pass from Josh Betts, Jared Parseghian XP good (ISU 10–7)

Third quarter

- MU – 08:42 Mike Smith 2yd run, Jared Parseghian XP good (MU 14–10)

Fourth quarter

- ISU – 13:13 Ryan Kock 1 yd run, Bret Culbertson XP good (ISU 17–14)

Top passers

- MU – Josh Betts 20/44, 240 yards, 1 TD, 1 INT
- ISU – Brett Meyer 10/28, 114 yards

Top rushers

- MU – Mike Smith 9 attempts, 46 yards, 1 TD
- ISU – Stevie Hicks 27 attempts, 159 yards, 1 TD

Top receivers

- MU – Ryne Robinson 7 receptions, 101 yards
- ISU – Todd Blythe 3 receptions, 42 yards

==== 2005 Houston Bowl ====
The Cyclones continued their success under McCarney in the 2005 season. High points during the season include a blowout win against #8 Iowa and a home victory over #22 Colorado. They missed out yet again on the Big 12 title when they lost in overtime to the Kansas after a missed field goal by Bret Culbertson. They led the game in the 4th quarter but allowed Kansas to come back. They got a berth in the 2005 Houston Bowl, but lost 24–27 to the TCU Horned Frogs.

TCU opened the game with back-to-back first quarter rushing touchdowns. The Cyclones responded with two Bret Meyer touchdown passes and by forcing a TCU safety. Late in the fourth quarter the game was tied at 24–24 but the Cyclones ultimately lost yet another bowl game on a fourth quarter field goal.

2005 Houston Bowl: Iowa State Cyclones vs. TCU Horned Frogs; Game Summary

Quarter	1	2	3	4	Total
Horned Frogs	14	10	6	3	33
Cyclones	0	17	7	0	24

at NRG Stadium, Houston, TX

- Date: December 31
- TV: ESPN

Game information

First quarter

- TCU – 10:19 Robert Merrill 20 yd run, Chris Manfredini XP good (TCU 7–0)
- TCU – 08:24 Aaron Brown 7 yd run, Chris Manfredini XP good (TCU 14–0)

Second quarter

- ISU – 14:14 Todd Blythe 48 yd pass from Brett Meyer, Bret Culbertson XP good (TCU 14–7)
- ISU – 12:50 Team safety (TCU 14–9)
- ISU – 10:30 Jon Davis 6 yd pass from Brett Meyer, two point conversion good (ISU 17–14)
- TCU – 04:05 Michael DePriest 84 yd pass from Jeff Ballard, Chris Manfredini XP good (TCU 21–17)
- TCU – 00:15 Chris Manfredini 29 yd field goal good (ISU 24–17)

Third quarter

- ISU – 01:53 Todd Blythe 22 yd pass from Bret Meyer, Bret Culbertson XP good (Tied 24–24)

Fourth quarter

- TCU – 05:25 Peter LoCoco 44 yd field goal good (TCU 27–24)

Top passers

- TCU – Jeff Ballard 21/33, 275 yards, 1 TD, 1 INT
- ISU – Brett Meyer 20/33, 254 yards, 3 TD, 2 INT

Top rushers

- TCU – Robert Merrill 11 attempts, 109 yards, 1 TD
- ISU – Brett Meyer 12 attempts, 27 yards

Top receivers

- TCU – Michael DePriest 3 receptions, 97 yards, 1 TD
- ISU – Todd Blythe 5 receptions, 105 yards, 2 TD

McCarney stepped down as head coach after a 4–8 2006 season. McCarney finished with a 56–85 all-time record.

==== All-Americans under Dan McCarney ====
All-Americans
Player	Position	Year
Troy Davis	RB	1995
Troy Davis	RB	1996
Ben Bruns	C	2000

==== Record under Dan McCarney ====
Record
Year	1995	1996	1997	1998	1999	2000	2001	2002	2003	2004	2005	2006
Record	3–8	2–9	1–10	3–8	4–7	9–3	7–5	7–7	2–10	7–5	7–5	4–8

=== Gene Chizik era (2007–2008) ===
To replace Dan McCarney Iowa State hired Texas defensive coordinator Gene Chizik. Iowa State wore 1977 throwback jerseys for the 2007 game against Iowa and re-introduced gold pants as a standard part of their uniform. It marked the 30th anniversary since the restart of the rivalry as well as the 30th anniversary of the 1977 Iowa State Peach Bowl team. They finished the season 3–9, including a 15–13 win over Iowa, and back-to-back wins against Kansas State and Colorado. All three wins were upsets. In 2008, Iowa State opened with two wins against weaker non-conference foes, before losing their next 10 games to finish the season 2–10. Chizik left the Cyclones after the season to become the head football coach of Auburn.

==== Record under Gene Chizik ====
Record
Year	2007	2008
Record	3–9	2–10

=== Paul Rhoads era (2009–2015) ===
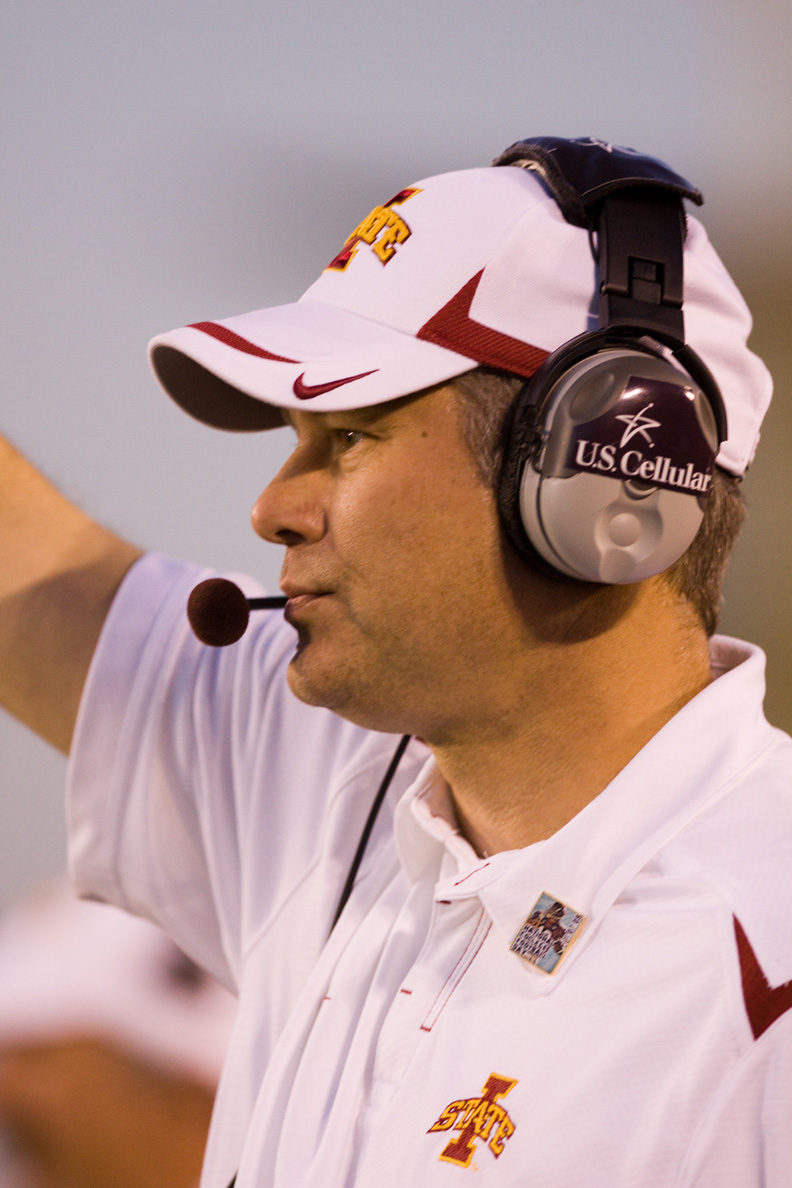
Rhoads as the head coach of Iowa State during a home game against Oklahoma State

Paul Rhoads was introduced as the 31st head coach of the Iowa State Cyclones on December 20, 2008. Rhoads had previously spent time at Iowa State as an assistant coach in the late nineties and was raised only 20 miles from Ames in Ankeny. His father, Cecil, was one of the winningest coaches in Iowa high school history, coaching for more than three decades and has been inducted into the Iowa High School Football Coaches Hall of Fame. Rhoads' contract was reported to be a 5-year deal worth $5.75 million and included incentives that could increase his salary. To round out his coaching staff Rhoads hired up-and-coming offensive coordinator out of Rice, Tom Herman and veteran defensive coordinator Wally Burnham.

==== 2009 Insight Bowl ====
Rhoads opened his ISU career with a win over FCS North Dakota State. He then led Iowa State to a victory at Kent State in his first year, ending a 17-game road losing streak. In October 2009 the Cyclones defeated Baylor to end an 11-game losing stretch against conference opponents, and then went on to defeat Nebraska in Lincoln for the first time since 1977. Their 6–6 record was enough to earn them an invitation to the Insight.com Bowl against Minnesota.

Austen Arnaud threw for 216 yards and a touchdown and ran for 77 yards and a touchdown as the Cyclones got their 1st bowl win since 2004. The Gophers were paced by receiver, Da'Jon McKnight who had 7 catches for 124 yards. With only a few minutes remaining in the fourth quarter, Minnesota quarterback Marqueis Gray fumbled the ball at the Iowa State 15-yard line. The ball was recovered by Ter'ran Benton of Iowa State. This prevented Minnesota from taking a late fourth quarter lead with either a field goal or a touchdown. The Cyclones won 14–13.

2009 Insight Bowl: Iowa State Cyclones vs. Minnesota Golden Gophers; Game Summary

Quarter	1	2	3	4	Total
Golden Gophers	3	0	10	0	13
Cyclones	0	14	0	0	14

at Sun Devil Stadium, Tempe, AZ

- Date: December 31
- Game attendance: 45,090
- TV announcers (NFL Network): Paul Burmeister (Play-by-play) & Mike Mayock (Color)

Game information

First quarter

- MN – 08:31 Eric Ellestad 36 yd field goal good (MN 3–0)

Second quarter

- ISU – 4:35 Austen Arnaud 9 yd rush, Grant Mahoney XP good (ISU 7–3)
- ISU – 00:23 Jake Williams 38 yd pass from Austen Arnaud, Grant Mahoney XP good (ISU 14–3)

Third quarter

- MN – 05:22 Nick Tow-Arnett 23 yd pass from Adam Weber, Eric Ellestad XP good (ISU 14–10)
- MN – 00:21 Eric Ellestad 21 yd field goal good (ISU 14–13)

Fourth quarter

Top passers

- MN – Adam Weber 18/32, 261 yards, 1 TD, 1 INT
- ISU – Austin Arnaud 19/26, 213 yards, 1 TD, 2 INT

Top rushers

- MN – De'Leon Eskridge 13 attempts, 43 yards
- ISU – Alexander Robinson 22 attempts, 137 yards

Top receivers

- MN – Da'Jon McKnight 7 receptions, 124 yards
- ISU – Jake Williams 6 receptions, 83 yards, 1 TD

==== 2011 Pinstripe Bowl ====
The lone highlight of the 2010 season was the first ever win at Texas in school history. They upset the #22 ranked Longhorns 28–21. The Cyclones would finish the season 3–5 in the Big 12 and 5–7 overall.

In 2011 Iowa State started off the season 3–0 including a triple overtime win over Iowa in Ames, and a win over Connecticut in East Hartford. The Cyclones would drop the next four games, starting out 0–4 in conference play but quickly bounce back. The Cyclones rebounded with a 41–7 win on October 29 at #19 Texas Tech. In the process, Iowa State managed to rack up 512 total yards, the most since the Nov 22, 2008, game at Kansas State. Several other school records were broken, including first-ever win in Lubbock, largest margin of victory against a ranked opponent], and most points scored against a ranked opponent since Nov. 9, 1996. On November 18, Iowa State faced off against undefeated #2 Oklahoma State led by Heisman frontrunner Brandon Weeden and two time Biletnikoff winner Justin Blackmon in Ames. Down 24–7 early in the second half, Iowa State came back with 17 unanswered points to force overtime. In overtime, Iowa State scored on its first play from scrimmage, but Oklahoma State answered back with their own touchdown. In the second overtime, Iowa State forced an interception and ran three Jeff Woody dives in a row to beat Oklahoma State 37–31, smashing Oklahoma State's chances of playing for a national championship and Brandon Weeden's Heisman shot. Iowa State became bowl eligible with the win and improved to 6–4. The win over Oklahoma State marks Iowa State's first ever win against an opponent in the top 6 (AP polls). The Cyclones finished the season 6–6 and would receive an invitation to the Pinstripe Bowl against the Rutgers Scarlet Knights.

ISU got off to a good start as Zach Guyer hit a 40-yard field goal on the game's opening possession. The Cyclones started the game with gains of 23, eight and 10 yards on the ground before the drive stalled and Guyer connected on the field goal. After a three-and-out by Rutgers, ISU again marched down the field and Guyer hit a 46-yard field goal to give the Cyclones a 6–0 edge. Rutgers would respond with the next 20 points of the game. In the fourth quarter, Cyclone Jeff Woody dashed in for his sixth touchdown of the season to close the gap to 20–13. Coleman's touchdown catch and an interception by Logan Ryan sealed the Cyclones’ fate. Steele Jantz, who replaced starter Jared Barnett in the second quarter, finished 15-of-31 for 197 yards. Aaron Horne grabbed five catches for 46 yards and Josh Lenz had four catches for 72 yards. Big 12 Co-Defensive Player of the Year A.J. Klein had a game-high 16 tackles.

2011 Pinstripe Bowl: Iowa State Cyclones vs. Rutgers Scarlet Knights; Game Summary

Quarter	1	2	3	4	Total
Scarlet Knights	0	17	0	10	27
Cyclones	6	0	0	7	13

at Yankee Stadium, Bronx, NY

- Date: December 30
- Game attendance: 38,328
- Referee: Randy Smith (Conference USA)
- TV announcers (NFL Network): Chris Fowler (Play-by-play), Jesse Palmer (Color) & Tom Rinaldi (Sidelines)

Game information

First quarter

- ISU – 13:41 Zach Guyer 40 yd field goal good (ISU 3–0)
- ISU – 07:35 Zach Guyer 45 yd field goal good (ISU 6–0)

Second quarter

- RUT – 12:39 Jawan Jamison 1 yd rush, San San Te XP good (RUT 7–6)
- RUT – 10:30 San San Te 21 yd field goal good (RUT 10–6)
- RUT – 02:24 Jawan Jamison 12 yd rush, San San Te XP good (RUT 17–6)

Third quarter
Fourth quarter

- RUT – 13:21 San San Te 29 yd field goal good (RUT 20–6)
- ISU – 10:10 Jawan Jamison 20 yd rush, Zach Guyer XP good (RUT 20–13)
- RUT – 05:47 Brandon Coleman 86 yd pass from Chas Dodd, San San Te XP good (RUT 27–13)

Top passers

- RUT – Chas Dodd 10/17, 176 yards, 1 TD
- ISU – Steele Jantz 15/31, 197 yards, 2 INT

Top rushers

- RUT – Jawan Jamison 27 attempts, 131 yards, 2 TD
- ISU – James White 9 attempts, 42 yards

Top receivers

- RUT – Brandon Coleman 1 receptions, 86 yards, 1 TD
- ISU – Josh Lenz 4 receptions, 72 yards

==== 2012 Liberty Bowl ====
The Cyclones opened the 2012 season 3–0 including a 9–6 win at Iowa for the first time in 10 years. The other major highlight of the season was ending TCU's at then-current longest winning streak in college football. They upset the #15 ranked Horned Frogs in Fort Worth 37–23. The 2012 season ended 6–7 and a berth in that year's Liberty Bowl against the Tulsa Golden Hurricane.

Iowa State stormed out of the gates with a Jeremy Reeves returned an interception 31 yards for a touchdown to put Iowa State up 10–0 with 7:44 remaining in the first quarter. After Tulsa responded with a nine-play drive that resulted in a touchdown, Sam Richardson hit Ernst Brun, who scampered in for the 69 yard score to make it 17–7 at the end of the opening stanza. That would be all the scoring for the Cyclones as Tulsa responded with the final 24 points of the game. Richardson, who battled illness, finished 10-for-21 for 129 yards in the air. The redshirt freshman also had a team-high 46 yards on the ground. Brun finished with four catches for 102 yards to lead the Cyclone receivers. Senior linebacker A.J. Klein capped off his career with 19 tackles.

2012 Liberty Bowl: Iowa State Cyclones vs. Tulsa Golden Hurricane; Game Summary

Quarter	1	2	3	4	Total
Cyclones	17	0	0	0	17
Golden Hurricane	7	14	7	3	31

at Liberty Bowl Memorial Stadium, Memphis, TN

- Date: December 31
- Game attendance: 53,687
- Referee: Alan Eck (Mountain West)
- TV announcers (ESPN): Mark Jones (Play-by-play), Brock Huard (Color) & Jessica Mendoza (Sidelines)

Game information

First quarter

- ISU – 10:47 Edwin Arceo 33 yd field goal good (ISU 3–0)
- ISU – 07:44 Jeremy Reeves 31 yd interception returned, Edwin Arceo XP good (ISU 10–0)
- TUL – 02:57 Alex Singleton 2 yd touchdown, Daniel Schwarz XP good (ISU 10–7)
- ISU – 01:01 Ernst Bruns 69 yd pass from Sam B. Richardson, Edwin Arceo XP good (ISU 17–7)

Second quarter

- TUL – 14–33 Cody Green 8 yd rush, Daniel Schwarz XP good (ISU 17–14)
- TUL – 11:10 02:57 Alex Singleton 2 yd touchdown, Daniel Schwarz XP good (TUL 21–17)

Third quarter

- TUL – 05:02 02:57 Alex Singleton 1 yd touchdown, Daniel Schwarz XP good (TUL 28–17)

Fourth quarter

- RUT – 02:23 Daniel Schwarz 40 yd field goal good (TUL 31–17)

Top passers

- TUL – Cody Green 11/23, 93 yards, 1 INT
- ISU – Sam B. Richardson 10/21, 129 yards, 1 TD, 1 INT

Top rushers

- TUL – Alex Singleton 15 attempts, 35 yards, 23 TD
- ISU – Sam B. Richardson 10 attempts, 46 yards

Top receivers

- TUL – Thomas Roberson 2 receptions, 35 yards
- ISU – Ernst Bruns 4 receptions, 102 yards, 1 TD

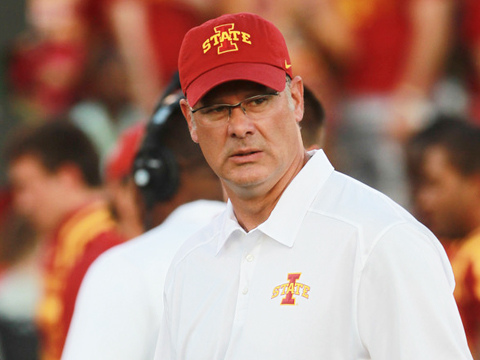
Rhoads finished his career 29–45 at Iowa State

On December 16, 2011, Iowa State signed Rhoads to a new ten-year contract worth $2 million annually excluding incentives. While things at the time appeared to be promising to move in a positive direction for the Cyclones, Rhoads' future teams were unable to recapture the success of his earlier teams. In his final three seasons, the Cyclones won just four Big 12 games (including a winless conference record in 2014) and went 8–27 overall. The 2015 season proved to be particularly difficult, as in two games, the Cyclones held double-digit halftime leads against both Oklahoma State and Kansas State only to lose late in the fourth quarter. Following a 38–35 loss to Kansas State on November 21, in which he came under heavy criticism for play-calling in the game's final 90 seconds, Rhoads was fired as head coach, effective the conclusion of the season.

==== All-Americans under Paul Rhoads ====
All-Americans
Player	Position	Year
Kelechi Osemele	OL	2011

==== Record under Paul Rhoads ====
Record
Year	2009	2010	2011	2012	2013	2014	2015
Record	7–6	5–7	6–7	6–7	3–9	2–10	3–9

=== Matt Campbell era (2016–2025) ===
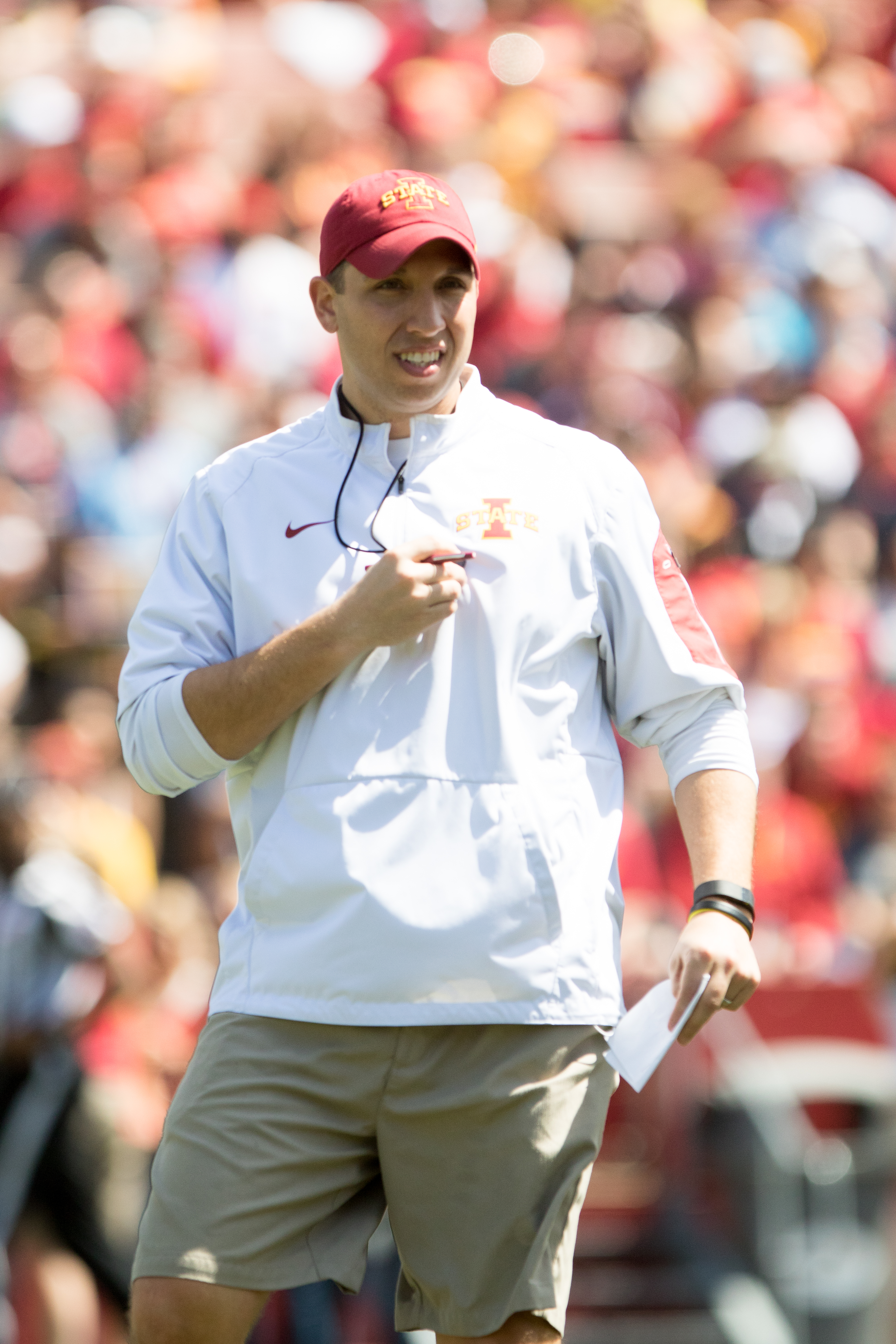
Head coach Matt Campbell

Matt Campbell, who had been the head coach at the University of Toledo, was named head coach at Iowa State on November 29, 2015. Campbell signed a six-year contract worth $2 million his first year. Campbell finished his first season as a Cyclone with a record of 3–9. Despite the disappointing record there were several high points during the season that showed progress including several near upsets and a blowout win over Texas Tech. The 66–10 rout of the Red Raiders included breaking several school records including points scored in a conference game.

==== 2017 Liberty Bowl ====
In Campbell's second season, the Cyclones experienced greater on-field success. After opening the season 2-2, the Cyclones upset the eventual conference champions, the #3 ranked Oklahoma Sooners. This was Iowa State's first win in Norman since 1990 only their sixth win against Oklahoma all-time. They followed up the Oklahoma win by going undefeated in the month of October including a win over #4 TCU. During the season the Cyclones were ranked as high as #14 in the AP Poll. Iowa State and Matt Campbell agreed to a six-year, $22.5 million extension with the school on November 27, 2017. On November 30, 2017, Campbell was named the Big 12 Coach of the Year. Finishing the regular season 7-5 and fourth in the Big 12. Iowa State was invited to the Liberty Bowl along with #20 Memphis.

Kyle Kempt threw for 314 yards and two touchdowns on 24 attempts en route to the Cyclones first bowl win since the 2009 Insight Bowl. The game was a low-scoring affair with Memphis holding a three-point lead with two minutes remaining in the third quarter. The final score was 21–20 in the Cyclones favor. Marcel Spears Jr. led the defense with 11 tackles, one sack, and 2.5 tackles for a loss. Allen Lazard set a Liberty Bowl record with 10 receptions, he also had 142 yards and a touchdown. This was enough to earn him MVP trophy.

2017 Liberty Bowl: Iowa State Cyclones vs. Memphis Tigers; Game Summary

Quarter	1	2	3	4	Total
Cyclones	7	7	7	0	21
Tigers	7	3	10	0	20

at Liberty Bowl Memorial Stadium, Memphis, TN

- Date: December 30
- Game attendance: 57,266
- TV announcers (ABC): Mike Patrick (Play-by-play) & Tommy Tuberville (Color)

Game information

First quarter

- ISU – 13:09 Hakeem Butler 52 yd pass from Kyle Kempt, Garrett Owens XP good (ISU 7–0)
- MEM – 06:00 Anthony Miller 10 yd pass from Cameron Moser, Riley Patterson XP good (7–7)

Second quarter

- ISU – 04:28 Joel Lanning 2 yd rush, Garrett Owens XP good (14–7)
- MEM – 00:00 Riley Patterson 34 yd field goal good (14–10)

Third quarter

- MEM – 13:22 Phil Mayhue 36 yd pass from Riley Ferguson, Riley Patterson XP good (14–17)
- ISU – 04:28 Allen Lazard 5 yd pass from Kyle Kempt, Garrett Owens XP good (ISU 21–17)
- MEM – 02:16 Riley Patterson 30 yd field goal good (21–20)

Fourth quarter

Top passers

- MEM – Riley Ferguson 21/33, 286 yards, 2 TD
- ISU – Kyle Kempt 24/38, 314 yards, 2 TD

Top rushers

- MEM – Patrick Taylor Jr. 17 attempts, 68 yards
- ISU – David Montgomery 24 attempts, 52 yards

Top receivers

- MEM – Phil Mayhue 5 receptions, 85 yards, 1 TD
- ISU – Allen Lazard 10 receptions, 142 yards, 1 TD

==== All-Americans under Matt Campbell ====
All-Americans
Player	Position	Year
Joel Lanning	LB	2017
Charlie Kolar	TE	2019, 2020
Breece Hall	RB	2020
Mike Rose	LB	2020
JaQuan Bailey	DE	2020

==== Record under Matt Campbell ====
Record
Year	2016	2017	2018	2019	2020
Record	3–9	8–5	8-4	7-6	9-3

== See also ==
- List of Iowa State Cyclones football All-Americans
- Iowa State Cyclones football statistical leaders
- List of Iowa State Cyclones in the NFL draft

== Bibliography ==
- Iowa State University (2006). Iowa State Cyclone Football (PDF). Archived from the original (PDF) on 2020-12-03.
- Miller, Jeffrey J. (August 3, 2015). Pop Warner. McFarland. ISBN 978-1-4766-2274-3.
