= 1977 Oklahoma State Cowboys football team =

American college football season

1977 Oklahoma State Cowboys football
- Conference: Big Eight Conference
- Record: 4–7 (2–5 Big 8)
- Head coach: Jim Stanley (5th season)
- Home stadium: Lewis Field

1977 Big Eight Conference football standings
	Conf.					Overall
Team	W		L		T	W		L		T
No. 7 Oklahoma $	7	–	0	–	0	10	–	2	–	0
Iowa State	5	–	2	–	0	8	–	4	–	0
No. 12 Nebraska	5	–	2	–	0	9	–	3	–	0
Colorado	3	–	3	–	1	7	–	3	–	1
Missouri	3	–	4	–	0	4	–	7	–	0
Kansas	2	–	4	–	1	4	–	6	–	1
Oklahoma State	2	–	5	–	0	4	–	7	–	0
Kansas State	0	–	7	–	0	2	–	9	–	0
$ – Conference champion; Rankings from AP Poll

The 1977 Oklahoma State Cowboys football team represented Oklahoma State University in the 1977 NCAA Division I football season. This was the 77th year of football at OSU and the fifth under Jim Stanley. The Cowboys played their home games at Lewis Field in Stillwater, Oklahoma. They finished the season 4–7, and 2–5 in the Big Eight Conference.

== Schedule ==
Date	Opponent	Rank	Site	Result	Attendance	Source
September 11	Tulsa*	No. 20	Lewis Field; Stillwater, OK (rivalry)	W 33–21	39,168	
September 18	at Arkansas*	No. 15	War Memorial Stadium; Little Rock, AR	L 6–28	54,280	
September 24	UTEP*		Lewis Field; Stillwater, OK	W 54–0	39,000	
October 1	Florida State*		Lewis Field; Stillwater, OK	L 17–25	46,500	
October 8	at No. 6 Colorado		Folsom Field; Boulder, CO	L 13–29	52,904	
October 15	Kansas State^{†}		Lewis Field; Stillwater, OK	W 21–14	48,200	
October 22	at Kansas		Memorial Stadium; Lawrence, KS	W 21–0	38,720	
October 29	No. 12 Nebraska		Lewis Field; Stillwater, OK	L 14–31	49,100	
November 5	No. 3 Oklahoma		Lewis Field; Stillwater, OK (Bedlam Series)	L 28–61	50,088	
November 12	Missouri		Faurot Field; Columbia, MO	L 14–41	56,219	
November 19	at Iowa State		Cyclone Stadium; Ames, IA	L 13–21	38,500	
*Non-conference game; ^{†}Homecoming; Rankings from AP Poll released prior to the game

== Roster ==
1977 Oklahoma State Cowboys football team roster
Players
Coaches
Offense

Pos.	#	Name	Class
TE		Donnie Echols	So
OT		Milton Hardaway	Sr
RB	43	Terry Miller	Sr

Defense

Pos.	#	Name	Class

Special teams

Pos.	#	Name	Class

Head coach

- Jim Stanley

Coordinators/assistant coaches

Legend

- (C) Team captain
- (S) Suspended
- (I) Ineligible
- Injured
- Redshirt

== After the season ==
The 1978 NFL draft took place on May 2–3, 1978 at the Roosevelt Hotel in New York City. The following Oklahoma State players were selected during the draft.

Player	Position	Round	Pick	NFL team
Terry Miller	RB	1st	5	Buffalo Bills
Milton Hardaway	T	2nd	41	San Diego Chargers
Daria Butler	LB	12th	320	Atlanta Falcons
