= Bud Moore =

Bud Moore may refer to:

- Bud Moore (American football) (1939–2026), American football player and coach
- Bud Moore (NASCAR owner) (1925–2017), American NASCAR owner
- Bud Moore (racing driver) (1941–2017), American NASCAR driver

== See also ==
- Bud Moore Engineering, the NASCAR owner's team
