= 1977 Missouri Tigers football team =

American college football season

1977 Missouri Tigers football
- Conference: Big Eight Conference
- Record: 4–7 (3–4 Big 8)
- Head coach: Al Onofrio (7th season)
- Offensive coordinator: Dick Jamieson (6th season)
- Defensive coordinator: Carl Reese (1st season)
- Home stadium: Memorial Stadium

1977 Big Eight Conference football standings
	Conf.					Overall
Team	W		L		T	W		L		T
No. 7 Oklahoma $	7	–	0	–	0	10	–	2	–	0
Iowa State	5	–	2	–	0	8	–	4	–	0
No. 12 Nebraska	5	–	2	–	0	9	–	3	–	0
Colorado	3	–	3	–	1	7	–	3	–	1
Missouri	3	–	4	–	0	4	–	7	–	0
Kansas	2	–	4	–	1	4	–	6	–	1
Oklahoma State	2	–	5	–	0	4	–	7	–	0
Kansas State	0	–	7	–	0	2	–	9	–	0
$ – Conference champion; Rankings from AP Poll

The 1977 Missouri Tigers football team was an American football team that represented the University of Missouri in the Big Eight Conference (Big 8) during the 1977 NCAA Division I football season. The team compiled a 4–7 record (3–4 against Big 8 opponents), finished in fifth place in the Big 8, and was outscored by opponents by a combined total of 195 to 180. Al Onofrio was the head coach for the last of seven seasons. The team played its home games at Faurot Field in Columbia, Missouri.

The team's statistical leaders included Earl Gant with 769 rushing yards, Pete Woods with 785 passing yards, Phil Bradley with 864 yards of total offense, Joe Stewart with 384 receiving yards, and Jeff Brockhaus with 49 points scored.

== Schedule ==
Date	Opponent	Site	Result	Attendance	Source
September 10	No. 4 USC*	Faurot Field; Columbia, MO	L 10–27	65,298	
September 17	at Illinois*	Memorial Stadium; Champaign, IL (rivalry)	L 7–11	52,771	
September 24	California*	Faurot Field; Columbia, MO	L 21–28	56,735	
October 1	at No. 20 Arizona State*	Sun Devil Stadium; Tempe, AZ	W 15–0	57,874	
October 8	at Iowa State	Cyclone Stadium; Ames, IA (rivalry)	L 0–7	48,000	
October 15	No. 7 Oklahoma	Faurot Field; Columbia, MO (rivalry)	L 17–21	63,774	
October 22	Kansas State	Faurot Field; Columbia, MO	W 28–13	63,168	
October 29	at No. 15 Colorado	Folsom Field; Boulder, CO	W 24–14	52,908	
November 5	No. 11 Nebraska	Faurot Field; Columbia, MO (rivalry)	L 10–21	67,261	
November 12	Oklahoma State	Faurot Field; Columbia, MO	W 41–14	56,219	
November 19	at Kansas	Memorial Stadium; Lawrence, KS (Border War)	L 22–24	44,870	
*Non-conference game; Rankings from AP Poll released prior to the game

== Roster ==
1977 Missouri Tigers football team roster
Players
Coaches
Offense

Pos.	#	Name	Class
WR	10	Leo Lewis	Jr
TE	83	Kellen Winslow	Jr
QB		Pete Woods

Defense

Pos.	#	Name	Class

Special teams

Pos.	#	Name	Class
K		Jeff Brockhaus

Head coach

- Al Onofrio

Coordinators/assistant coaches

- Dick Jamieson – Offensive coordinator
- Carl Reese – Defensive coordinator
- Dave McGinnis – Defensive backs
- Tony Steponovich – Assistant
- Dennis Raetz – Assistant
- Curtis Jones Sr. – Assistant
- John Kadlec – Assistant
- Don Lawrence – Assistant

Legend

- (C) Team captain
- (S) Suspended
- (I) Ineligible
- Injured
- Redshirt
