= 1977 Kansas Jayhawks football team =

American college football season

1977 Kansas Jayhawks football
- Conference: Big Eight Conference
- Record: 4-6-1 (2–4–1 Big 8)
- Head coach: Bud Moore (3rd season)
- Offensive coordinator: John Levra (3rd season)
- Defensive coordinator: Larry Jones (1st season)
- Captains: Tom Fitch; Tom Dinkel; John Masacarello
- Home stadium: Memorial Stadium

1977 Big Eight Conference football standings
| | Conf. | | | | | Overall |
| Team | W | | L | | T | W | | L | | T |
|---|---|---|---|---|---|---|---|---|---|---|
| No. 7 Oklahoma $ | 7 | – | 0 | – | 0 | 10 | – | 2 | – | 0 |
| Iowa State | 5 | – | 2 | – | 0 | 8 | – | 4 | – | 0 |
| No. 12 Nebraska | 5 | – | 2 | – | 0 | 9 | – | 3 | – | 0 |
| Colorado | 3 | – | 3 | – | 1 | 7 | – | 3 | – | 1 |
| Missouri | 3 | – | 4 | – | 0 | 4 | – | 7 | – | 0 |
| Kansas | 2 | – | 4 | – | 1 | 4 | – | 6 | – | 1 |
| Oklahoma State | 2 | – | 5 | – | 0 | 4 | – | 7 | – | 0 |
| Kansas State | 0 | – | 7 | – | 0 | 2 | – | 9 | – | 0 |
$ – Conference champion; Rankings from AP Poll

The 1977 Kansas Jayhawks football team represented the University of Kansas in the Big Eight Conference during the 1977 NCAA Division I football season. In their third season under head coach Bud Moore, the Jayhawks compiled a 4–6–1 record (2–4–1 against conference opponents), finished in sixth place in the conference, and were outscored by opponents by a combined total of 269 to 131. They played their home games at Memorial Stadium in Lawrence, Kansas.

The team's statistical leaders included Brian Bethke with 384 passing yards, Norris Banks with 655 rushing yards, and David Verser with 220 receiving yards. Tom Fitch, Tom Dinkel, and John Masacarello were the team captains.

== Schedule ==
| Date | Opponent | Site | Result | Attendance | Source |
|---|---|---|---|---|---|
| September 10 | at No. 9 Texas A&M* | Kyle Field; College Station, TX | L 14–28 | 51,494–53,585 | |
| September 17 | at No. 14 UCLA* | Los Angeles Memorial Coliseum; Los Angeles, CA | W 7–17 (UCLA forfeit) | 40,738 | |
| September 24 | No. 15 Washington State* | Memorial Stadium; Lawrence, KS | W 14–12 | 44,540 | |
| October 1 | at No. 1 Oklahoma | Oklahoma Memorial Stadium; Norman, OK | L 9–24 | 71,184 | |
| October 8 | at Miami (FL)* | Miami Orange Bowl; Miami, FL | L 7–14 | 28,010 | |
| October 15 | No. 3 Colorado^{†} | Memorial Stadium; Lawrence, KS | T 17–17 | 39,320 | |
| October 22 | Oklahoma State | Memorial Stadium; Lawrence, KS | L 0–21 | 38,720 | |
| October 29 | at Iowa State | Cyclone Stadium; Ames, IA | L 3–41 | 48,500 | |
| November 5 | Kansas State | Memorial Stadium; Lawrence, KS (rivalry) | W 29–21 | 50,170 | |
| November 12 | at No. 12 Nebraska | Memorial Stadium; Lincoln, NE (rivalry) | L 7–52 | 76,392 | |
| November 19 | Missouri | Memorial Stadium; Lawrence, KS (Border War) | W 24–22 | 44,870 | |
*Non-conference game; ^{†}Homecoming; Rankings from AP Poll released prior to the game

== Roster ==
1977 Kansas Jayhawks football team roster
Players
Coaches
Offense

| Pos. | # | Name | Class |
|---|---|---|---|
| QB | | Brian Bethke |
| RB | 23 | Billy Campfield | Sr |
| TE | 88 | Kirby Criswell | So |
| OT | 64 | Lindsey Mason | Sr |
| RB | 26 | Harry Sydney | Fr |
| WR | 84 | David Verser | Fr |
| C | 54 | Mike Wellman | Jr |

Defense

| Pos. | # | Name | Class |
|---|---|---|---|
| DE | 93 | Tom Dinkel | Sr |
| SS | 13 | Tom Fitch | Sr |
| CB | 47 | LeRoy Irvin | So |
| FS | 40 | Frank Wattelet | Fr |
| LB | 51 | Jim Zidd | So |

Special teams

| Pos. | # | Name | Class |
|---|---|---|---|
| P | 18 | Mike Hubach | So |

Head coach

- Bud Moore

Coordinators/assistant coaches

Legend

- (C) Team captain
- (S) Suspended
- (I) Ineligible
- Injured
- Redshirt
