= 1977 Kansas State Wildcats football team =

American college football season

1977 Kansas State Wildcats football
- Conference: Big Eight Conference
- Record: 2–9 (0–7 Big 8)
- Head coach: Ellis Rainsberger (3rd season)
- Defensive coordinator: Dick Selcer (3rd season)
- Home stadium: KSU Stadium

1977 Big Eight Conference football standings
	Conf.					Overall
Team	W		L		T	W		L		T
No. 7 Oklahoma $	7	–	0	–	0	10	–	2	–	0
Iowa State	5	–	2	–	0	8	–	4	–	0
No. 12 Nebraska	5	–	2	–	0	9	–	3	–	0
Colorado	3	–	3	–	1	7	–	3	–	1
Missouri	3	–	4	–	0	4	–	7	–	0
Kansas	2	–	4	–	1	4	–	6	–	1
Oklahoma State	2	–	5	–	0	4	–	7	–	0
Kansas State	0	–	7	–	0	2	–	9	–	0
$ – Conference champion; Rankings from AP Poll

The 1977 Kansas State Wildcats football team represented Kansas State University in the 1977 NCAA Division I football season. The team's head football coach was Ellis Rainsberger. 1977 would turn out to be the last season with Rainsberger at the helm, as he was replaced with Jim Dickey in 1978. The Wildcats played their home games in KSU Stadium. 1977 saw the Wildcats finish with a record of 2–9, and a dismal 0–7 record in Big Eight Conference play.

== Schedule ==
Date	Opponent	Site	Result	Attendance	Source
September 10	at BYU*	Cougar Stadium; Provo, UT	L 0–39	35,196	
September 17	Florida State*	KSU Stadium; Manhattan, KS	L 10–18	26,200	
September 24	at Wichita State*	Cessna Stadium; Wichita, KS	W 21–14	28,724	
October 1	No. 18 Mississippi State*	KSU Stadium; Manhattan, KS	W 21–24 (forfeit)^	30,060	
October 8	No. 9 Nebraska	KSU Stadium; Manhattan, KS (rivalry)	L 9–26	41,100	
October 15	at Oklahoma State	Lewis Field; Stillwater, OK	L 14–21	48,200	
October 22	at Missouri	Faurot Field; Columbia, MO	L 13–28	63,168	
October 29	No. 4 Oklahoma	KSU Stadium; Manhattan, KS	L 7–42	25,600	
November 5	at Kansas	Memorial Stadium; Lawrence, KS (rivalry)	L 21–29	50,170	
November 12	Iowa State^{†}	KSU Stadium; Manhattan, KS (rivalry)	L 15–22	21,800	
November 19	at Colorado	Folsom Field; Boulder, CO (rivalry)	L 0–23	43,873	
*Non-conference game; ^{†}Homecoming; Rankings from AP Poll released prior to the game

^ Mississippi State was forced to forfeit the game.

== Roster ==
1977 Kansas State Wildcats football team roster
Players
Coaches
Offense

Pos.	#	Name	Class
TE	81	Paul Coffman	Sr
QB	9	Wendell Henrikson	Sr
QB	10	Dan Manucci	Jr
TE	93	Jim Miller	So

Defense

Pos.	#	Name	Class
NG	89	Greg Brown	So
CB	36	J. J. Miller	So
LB	59	Gary Spani	Sr

Special teams

Pos.	#	Name	Class

Head coach

- Ellis Rainsberger

Coordinators/assistant coaches

- J.W. Emerson – Quarterbacks & wide receivers
- Jim Gilstrap – Offensive line
- Dick Selcer – Defensive Coordinator
- Sandy Buda – Defensive line
- Bobby Robinson – Assistant
- Dave Dunkelberger – Assistant
- George Walstad – Assistant
- Ivy Williams – Assistant

Legend

- (C) Team captain
- (S) Suspended
- (I) Ineligible
- Injured
- Redshirt
