= Mike Wellman =

American football player (born 1956)

No. 65
- Position: Center

Personal information
- Born: July 15, 1956 (age 70); Newton, Kansas, U.S.
- Listed height: 6 ft 3 in (1.91 m)
- Listed weight: 253 lb (115 kg)

Career information
- High school: Lawrence (Lawrence, Kansas)
- College: Kansas
- NFL draft: 1979: 3rd round, 81st overall pick

Career history
- Los Angeles Rams (1979)*; Green Bay Packers (1979–1980); Kansas City Chiefs (1981)*; Edmonton Eskimos (1982)*; San Francisco 49ers (1983–1984)*
- * Offseason or practice squad member only

Career NFL statistics
- Games played: 20
- Stats at Pro Football Reference

Michael J. Wellman (born July 15, 1956) is an American former professional football player who was a center in the National Football League (NFL). He played college football for the Kansas Jayhawks and was selected in the third round of the 1979 NFL draft by the Los Angeles Rams. He later had stints with the Green Bay Packers, Kansas City Chiefs, Edmonton Eskimos and San Francisco 49ers.

== Early life and education ==
Wellman was born on July 15, 1956, in Newton, Kansas. He was the son of Vere Wellman, a football coach. He attended Lawrence High School and competed in football as well as in track and field. He was the fifth Lawrence alumni to make it to the NFL.

Wellman began his collegiate career with the Kansas Jayhawks in 1975. He earned a starting role at center as a sophomore in 1976, as the Jayhawks compiled a record of 6–5. He remained a starter in the 1977 season as a junior during the Jayhawks' 3–7–1 season. He added 15 points for his senior season in 1978, and although Kansas went 1–10, Wellman was selected All-Big Eight Conference and was invited to the Senior Bowl. In addition to playing center for the Jayhawks, Wellman also was a long snapper and could play guard.

== Professional career ==
Wellman was selected in the third round (81st overall) of the 1979 NFL draft by the Los Angeles Rams. He was traded to the Green Bay Packers in exchange for a middle round 1981 draft pick in August 1979 after the Packers were "desperate" for a center. He was one of nine rookies to make the 1979 Packers squad. He made his NFL debut in a 6–3 loss to the Chicago Bears and ended up playing all 16 games for the team in 1979.

Wellman was a backup to Larry McCarren and saw little playing time, however; an article from United Press International (UPI) noted that he "sat, sat, sat" and that "[e]xcept for an occasional long snap with the Packers, Wellman's career has been punctuated by clean pants." His only statistic recorded in 1979 was a 10-yard kickoff return. Wellman returned to the Packers in 1980 and made the team, but was placed on injured reserve after four games with an undisclosed non-football illness. He was released by the team on October 30, 1980.

After being released by the Packers, Wellman considered retiring, but then "spent more hours in the weight room ... than ever before" in an attempt to return to the NFL. He was signed by the Kansas City Chiefs on April 2, 1981. He was waived, however, on August 18 that year. Wellman then tried to make the Edmonton Eskimos of the Canadian Football League (CFL) for the 1982 season but did not make the team. He had a comeback attempt in 1983 with the San Francisco 49ers, but was released in August of that year after having been signed in June. He then signed with the team again on July 22, 1984, only to be released on August 8. He finished his professional career with 20 games played, none as a starter.
