= Elvis Peacock =

American football player (born 1956)

No. 34, 20
- Position: Running back

Personal information
- Born: November 7, 1956 (age 69); Miami, Florida, U.S
- Listed height: 6 ft 1 in (1.85 m)
- Listed weight: 212 lb (96 kg)

Career information
- High school: Miami Central (West Little River, Florida)
- College: Oklahoma
- NFL draft: 1978: 1st round, 20th overall pick

Career history
- Los Angeles Rams (1978–1980); Cincinnati Bengals (1981)

Awards and highlights
- 2× National champion (1974, 1975); Second-team All-Big Eight (1977)

Career NFL statistics
- Rushing yards: 1,001
- Rushing average: 4.6
- Rushing touchdowns: 7
- Stats at Pro Football Reference

Elvis Zaring Peacock (born November 7, 1956) is an American former professional football player who was a running back for the Los Angeles Rams of the National Football League (NFL) from 1978 through 1980.

One of the fastest big backs of the 1970s college football scene, Peacock clocked a 9.4 second 100-yard dash while weighing 212 pounds and still in high school. This compared to the then world record of 9.1.

== College career ==
Recruited out of Miami South High School in Florida, Peacock saw action in the Wishbone offense run by head coach Barry Switzer. Oklahoma was led by quarterback Steve Davis, and star running back Joe Washington. Oklahoma would finished 7-0 in the Big Eight conference and 11-0 overall, on their way to winning a national championship. That year, as a freshman, Peacock ran 55 times for 428 yards and seven touchdowns. In his sophomore season, Peacock took a step back, as Washington and Horace Ivory were the lead running backs for Oklahoma, and Peacock found himself challenged for playing time by a freshman named Billy Sims. Peacock ran 68 times for 322 yards. And Oklahoma again was the nation champion, scoring a bowl win over Michigan.

Peacock was part of a deep rotation at running back. Not only was he splitting time with Ivory, but Kenny King as well. With Joe Washington drafted by the Baltimore Colts and Steve Davis graduated, Dean Blevins took over at quarterback. A personal three peat was in the cards for Peacock. Oklahoma finished 9-2-1 and defeated Wyoming in the Fiesta Bowl 41-7.

1977 saw Peacock establish himself some more. With now Ivory gone, drafted by the New England Patriots, Peacock teamed with Kenny King to give the Sooners one of the most potent running games in college football. Meanwhile, Sims and new freshman back, David Overstreet, impressed and were showing themselves deserving of playing time as well. In his final college season, Peacock rushed 121 times for 695 yards and two touchdowns.

== Professional career ==
In the 1978 NFL draft, the Los Angeles Rams selected Peacock in the first round, 20th overall. Peacock was the third running back taken in the first round that year. He followed Terry Miller, who'd been drafted by the Buffalo Bills, and Earl Campbell, drafted by the Houston Oilers.

Peacock played behind starter Cullen Bryant. With star Lawrence McCutcheon on the downside of his career, the Rams were looking for his replacement. Peacock, who'd been drafted in the first round, found himself again in the pros in a crowded running back room that included Jim Jodat and Wendell Tyler. And still yet, much of the running game relied on powerful fullback, John Cappelletti. In his rookie year, Peacock rushed 52 times for 224 yards, no touchdowns and zero starts. The Rams were defeated in the Super Bowl by the Pittsburgh Steelers, but Peacock did not see any action in the game.

The following year, Cappelletti was gone, traded to the San Diego Chargers which moved Peacock into the starting role. In his second season, he'd have what would be his best as a pro, rushing 164 times for 777 yards and seven touchdowns. The Rams were defeated in the wild card by the Dallas Cowboys.

Peacock's career would be cut short by injuries. He played three games for the Cincinnati Bengals in 1981 before he was released. His career was over by age 25.

== Post NFL career ==
After retirement, Peacock seldom spoke about his NFL career and worked at a factory for a food shipping company. His son, Elvis Peacock Jr., was unaware that his father had played in the NFL until his second grade teacher told him. It was then that he asked his father about football, and the elder Peacock opened up to him about. Though Elvis Peacock's son never played sports, he did go on to manage a successful Red Lobster in Oklahoma City.

As of 2022, Peacock still lives in Miami, Florida.
