= 1977 Nebraska Cornhuskers football team =

American college football season

1977 Nebraska Cornhuskers football

Liberty Bowl champion

Liberty Bowl, W 21–17 vs. North Carolina
- Conference: Big Eight Conference

Ranking
- Coaches: No. 10
- AP: No. 12
- Record: 9–3 (5–2 Big 8)
- Head coach: Tom Osborne (5th season)
- Offensive scheme: I formation
- Defensive coordinator: Lance Van Zandt (1st season)
- Base defense: 5–2
- Home stadium: Memorial Stadium

1977 Big Eight Conference football standings
	Conf.					Overall
Team	W		L		T	W		L		T
No. 7 Oklahoma $	7	–	0	–	0	10	–	2	–	0
Iowa State	5	–	2	–	0	8	–	4	–	0
No. 12 Nebraska	5	–	2	–	0	9	–	3	–	0
Colorado	3	–	3	–	1	7	–	3	–	1
Missouri	3	–	4	–	0	4	–	7	–	0
Kansas	2	–	4	–	1	4	–	6	–	1
Oklahoma State	2	–	5	–	0	4	–	7	–	0
Kansas State	0	–	7	–	0	2	–	9	–	0
$ – Conference champion; Rankings from AP Poll

The 1977 Nebraska Cornhuskers football team represented the University of Nebraska–Lincoln in the 1977 NCAA Division I football season. The team was coached by Tom Osborne and played their home games in Memorial Stadium in Lincoln, Nebraska.

== Schedule ==
Date	Time	Opponent	Rank	Site	TV	Result	Attendance	Source
September 10	1:30 pm	Washington State*	No. 15	Memorial Stadium; Lincoln, NE		L 10–19	75,922	
September 17	12:45 pm	No. 4 Alabama*		Memorial Stadium; Lincoln, NE	ABC	W 31–24	75,899	
September 24	1:30 pm	Baylor*	No. 14	Memorial Stadium; Lincoln, NE		W 31–10	76,231	
October 1	1:30 pm	Indiana*	No. 11	Memorial Stadium; Lincoln, NE		W 31–13	76,034	
October 8	1:30 pm	at Kansas State	No. 9	KSU Stadium; Manhattan, KS (rivalry)		W 26–9	41,100	
October 15	1:30 pm	Iowa State	No. 9	Memorial Stadium; Lincoln, NE (rivalry)		L 21–24	76,090	
October 22	1:30 pm	No. 7 Colorado^{†}	No. 18	Memorial Stadium; Lincoln, NE (rivalry)		W 33–15	76,486	
October 29	12:45 pm	at Oklahoma State	No. 12	Lewis Field; Stillwater, OK	ABC	W 31–14	49,100	
November 5	1:30 pm	at Missouri	No. 11	Faurot Field; Columbia, MO (rivalry)		W 21–10	67,261	
November 12	1:30 pm	Kansas	No. 12	Memorial Stadium; Lincoln, NE (rivalry)		W 52–7	76,392	
November 25	1:25 pm	at No. 3 Oklahoma	No. 11	Oklahoma Memorial Stadium; Norman, OK (rivalry)	ABC	L 7–38	71,184	
December 19	8:05 pm	vs. No. 14 North Carolina*	No. 12	Liberty Bowl Memorial Stadium; Memphis, TN (Liberty Bowl)	ABC	W 21–17	49,456	
*Non-conference game; ^{†}Homecoming; Rankings from AP Poll released prior to the game; All times are in Central time

== Roster ==
Anderson, Rene #2 (Sr.) DB; Andrews, George #96 (Jr.) DE; Anthony, Monte #49 (Sr.) IB; Barnett, Bill #97 (So.) DT; Berns, Richard #35 (Jr.) IB; Bishop, Keith #53 (Jr.) C Bloom, Jeff #50 (So.) C Brown, Kenny #22 (Jr.) WB; Bruce, Mike #76 (So.) OT; Bryant, Bill #95 (Jr.) DT; Burns, Ed #17 (Sr.) QB; Carpenter, Jeff #37 (Sr.) LB; Cass, Dan #8 (So.) DB; Clark, Kelvin #73 (Jr.) OT; Cole, Lawrence #81 (So.) DE; Cooley, Lawrence #67 (Jr.) OG; Cotton, Barney #54 (Jr.) C Craig, Curtis #33 (Sr.) WB; Davis, Tom #52 (Sr.) C Dixon, Rod #5 (Jr.) PK; Donnell, Dodie #45 (Sr.) FB; Dufresne, Mark #88 (Sr.) TE; Dunning, Bruce #40 (So.) LB; England, Gary #91 (So.) DT; Everett, Earl #9 (Sr.) WB; Fischer, Tim #16 (Jr.) DB; Franklin, Andra (So.) FB; Frei, Steve #27 (So.) DB; Garcia, Randy #18 (Sr.) QB; Gast, Reg #82 (Sr.) DE; Gemar, Scott #1 (So.) PK; Glenn, Steve #71 (Jr.) OT	Goodspeed, Mark #72 (So.) OT; Hager, Tim #10 (So.) QB; Hansen, Jeff #48 (Jr.) DB; Harvey, Ted #31 (Sr.) DB; Havekost, John #69 (So.) OG; Hedrick, Brian #43 (So.) DT; Henson, Zac #79(Sr.) OGK; Hipp, I.M. #32 (So.) IB; Horn, Rod #55 (So.) DT; Ingram, John #19 (So.) DB; Jorgensen, Greg #63 (Sr.) OG; Keith, Percy #21 (So.) DB; Keuten, John #64 (So.) OG; Kunz, Lee #38 (Jr.) LB; Lee, Jeff #26 (Jr.) SE; Lee, Oudious #65 (So.) MG; Lehigh, Pat #6 (Jr.) DB; Lindquist, Steve #68 (Jr.) OG; Lockett, Frank #80 (Jr.) SE; Loken, Rocke #87 (Sr.) SE; Markus, Steve #56 (Sr.) LB; Matthies, Tom #77 (So.) OT; McCrady, Tim #24 (So.) WB; McQuitter, Greg #41 (Jr.) DB; Means, Andy #34 (So.) DB; Miller, Junior #89 (So.) TE; Moritz, Brett #70 (Sr.) OG; Nelson, Derrie #92 (So.) DE; O'Doherty, Dave #78 (So.) OT; Ohrt, Tom #74 (Jr.) OT; Payne, Dennis #13 (Jr.) DB; Pensick, Dan #93 (So.) DT; Pillen, Jim #29 (Jr.) DB	Poeschl, Randy #75 (Jr.) DT; Powers, Dana #28 (So.) DB; Pullen, Jeff #66 (Sr.) MG; Quinn, Jeff #11 (So.) QB; Rick, Randy #90 (Sr.) DE; Roehrs, Kelvin #99 (Jr.) MG; Ruud, John #46 (So.) LB; Saalfeld, Kelly #57 (Jr.) C Samuel, Tony #98 (Sr.) DE; Schleusener, Randy #61 (So.) OG; Selko, John #83 (Jr.) TE; Smith, Kent #23 (Sr.) DB; Smith, Tim #84 (So.) SE; Sorley, Tom #12 (Jr.) QB; Spaeth, Ken #86 (Sr.) TE; Steiner, Dan #58 (So.) OG; Steward, Keith #44 (Jr.) FB; Stewart, Byron #30 (Jr.) IB; Stroh, Mark #85 (So.) DE; Sukup, Dean #3 (So.) PK; Todd, Billy #14 (Jr.) PK; Valasek, Larry #4 (Sr.) DB; Vering, Tom #47 (Jr.) LB; Waldemore, Stan #62 (Sr.) OT; Walton, Darrell #7 (Jr.) DB; Washington, Mike #36 (So.) FB; Weinmaster, Kerry #51 (So.) MG; Wightman, Jim #59 (Sr.) LB; Wurth, Tim #25 (So.) IB; Young, Larry #94 (Jr.) DE; Young, Willie #39 (So.) LB

=== Depth chart ===
Defense

FS
Larry Valasek
Jeff Hansen
Dennis Payne

INSDIE	INSDIE
Jeff Carpenter	Lee Kunz
Tom Vering	Jim Whightman
Bruce Dunning	John Ruud

MONSTER BACK
Jim Pillen
Kent Smith
Percy Keith

CB
Ted Harvey
Darrell Walton
David Ligel

DE	DT	NT	DT	DE
Georgie Andrews	Barney Cotton	Kerry Weinmater	Randy Poeschl	Tony Samuel
Randy Rick	Dan Pensick	Oudious Lee	Bill Barnett; Rod Horn	Larry Young
Reg Gast	Bill Bryant	Jeff Pullen	Brian Hedrick	Lawrence Cole

CB
Rene Anderson
Tim Fischer
Sammy Sims

Offense

SE
Tim Smith
Rocke Loken
Jeff Lee

LT	LG	C	RG	RT
Kelvin Clark	Greg Jorgensen	Tom Davis	Steve Lindquist	Stan Waldemore
Steve Glenn	Lawrence Cooley	Kelly Saaifeld	Brett Mortiz	Tom Ohrt
Mark Goodspeed	John Havekost	Jeff Bloom	Dan Steiner	Dave O'Doherty

TE
Ken Spaeth
Mark Dufresne
Junior Miller
John Selko

WB
Curtis Craig
Kenny Brown
Tim McCrady

QB
Tom Sorley
Randy Garcia
Ed Burns
⋅

FB
Dodie Donnell
Monte Anthony
Andra Franklin

Special teams
PK Billy Todd
P Tim Smith

RB
I.M Hipp
Rick Burns
Curtis Craig
Tim Wurth

== Coaching staff ==
Name	Title	First year in this position	Years at Nebraska	Alma mater
Tom Osborne	Head coach Offensive coordinator	1973	1964–1997	Hastings College
Lance Van Zandt	Defensive Coordinator; Defensive backs	1977	1977–1980	Lamar
Cletus Fischer	Offensive Line		1960–1985	Nebraska
John Melton	Linebackers	1973	1962–1988	Wyoming
Mike Corgan	Running Backs	1962	1962–1982	Notre Dame
Boyd Epley	Head Strength Coach	1969	1969–2003	Nebraska
Jerry Moore	Wide Receivers	1973	1973–1978	Baylor
George Darlington	Defensive Ends		1973–2002	Rutgers
Milt Tenopir	Offensive Line	1974	1974–2002	Sterling
Guy Ingles	Freshman Head Coach		1976–1978	Nebraska
Gene Huey	Receivers	1977	1977–1986	Wyoming
Charlie McBride	Defensive Line	1977	1977–1999	Colorado

== Game summaries ==
=== Washington State ===
Washington State at #15 Nebraska [box score]

Team	1	2	3	4	Total
• Washington State	0	7	7	5	19
#15 Nebraska	0	7	0	3	10

- Date: 1977-09-10
- Location: Memorial Stadium, Lincoln, Nebraska
- Game attendance: 75,922

Scoring summary
Q2	7:30	WSU	Kelly 19 yard pass from Thompson (Watson kick)	WSU 7–0
Q2	3:27	NEB	Berns 20 yard run (Todd kick)	Tie 7–7
Q3	4:05	WSU	Kelly 20 yard pass from Thompson (Watson kick)	WSU 14–7
Q4	11:35	NEB	Todd 19 yard field goal	WSU 14–10
Q4	8:06	WSU	Watson 35 yard field goal	WSU 17–10
Q4	6:18	WSU	Safety, Garcia tackled in end zone	WSU 19–10

Nebraska convincingly dominated Washington State on the field and statistically, but fumbled repeatedly, including three times inside the Cougar 10-yard line and once on a punt. Despite the miscues, Nebraska still held onto a 7–7 tie at halftime. As the game progressed and Washington State began to pull away, Nebraska kept piling up the statistics but failed to get any closer than 10–14 before the Cougars iced the game with a field goal and a safety in the 4th quarter. The numbers defied the scoreboard, as Nebraska led in first downs 24–14, on the ground 247–120 and in the air 223–174, but the number that mattered was 0–1 to start the season.

=== Alabama ===
#4 Alabama at Nebraska [box score]

Team	1	2	3	4	Total
#4 Alabama	7	10	0	7	24
• Nebraska	10	7	7	7	31

- Date: 1977-09-17
- Location: Memorial Stadium, Lincoln, Nebraska
- Game attendance: 75,899
- Television network: ABC

Scoring summary
Q1	10:38	NEB	Todd 29 yard field goal	NEB 3–0
Q1	7:36	ALA	Rutledge 7 yard run (Chapman kick)	ALA 7–3
Q1	0:31	NEB	Berns 7 yard pass from Garcia (Todd kick)	NEB 10–7
Q2	10:45	ALA	Nathan 2 yard run (Chapman kick)	ALA 14–10
Q2	3:26	NEB	Berns 2 yard run (Todd kick)	NEB 17–14
Q2	0:10	ALA	Chapman 37 yard field goal	Tie 17–17
Q3	10:54	NEB	Craig 17 yard run (Todd kick)	NEB 24–17
Q3	12:24	ALA	Nathan 1 yard run (Chapman kick)	Tie 24–24
Q4	7:12	NEB	Berns 2 yard run (Todd kick)	NEB 31–24

Alabama came into Lincoln ranked #2 as Nebraska was still feeling the sting of the loss to Washington State and a rare absence from the polls. While the Crimson Tide slightly exceeded the Cornhuskers on offensive production, the 5–1 interception ratio and 25–17 first down edge each helped give Nebraska the edge to pull off the stunning upset.

=== Baylor ===
Baylor at #14 Nebraska [box score]

Team	1	2	3	4	Total
Baylor	3	0	7	0	10
• #14 Nebraska	10	13	0	8	31

- Date: 1977-09-24
- Location: Memorial Stadium, Lincoln, Nebraska
- Game attendance: 76,231

Baylor was behind 10–3 by the end of the 1st quarter, and their only other score was a 3rd-quarter touchdown made possible in part by a lost Nebraska fumble. It was the offensive production that told the story of the day, as Nebraska rolled up 414 yards compared to the 182 produced by Baylor.

=== Indiana ===
Indiana at #11 Nebraska [box score]

Team	1	2	3	4	Total
Indiana	7	3	3	0	13
• #11 Nebraska	10	7	0	14	31

- Date: 1977-10-01
- Location: Memorial Stadium, Lincoln, Nebraska
- Game attendance: 76,034

Nebraska IB I.M. Hipp, starting place of injured IB Rick Berns, set a new single game rushing record of 254 yards, besting the previous record of 211 set the previous year by Berns. Despite that performance, the game actually was in doubt entering the 4th quarter as the Hoosiers trailed 13–17, but the Cornhuskers added two more touchdowns soon after and came away with their 3rd consecutive 31-point score and win to close out the non-conference slate.

=== Kansas State ===
#9 Nebraska at Kansas State [box score]

Team	1	2	3	4	Total
• #9 Nebraska	0	10	7	9	26
Kansas State	3	0	0	6	9

- Date: 1977-10-08
- Location: KSU Stadium, Manhattan, Kansas
- Game attendance: 41,100

Two long touchdown runs by Nebraska IB I.M. Hipp created the gap between Kansas State and Nebraska, but the three interceptions suffered by the Wildcats also hurt any hopes that Kansas State may have had to put up a fight. Though Nebraska started out behind 0–3 in the 1st quarter, they scored the next touchdown and never looked back.

=== Iowa State ===
Iowa State at #9 Nebraska [box score]

Team	1	2	3	4	Total
• Iowa State	7	14	3	0	24
#9 Nebraska	14	0	7	0	21

- Date: 1977-10-15
- Location: Memorial Stadium, Lincoln, Nebraska
- Game attendance: 76,090

Nebraska struck first and still held the 14–7 lead by the end of the 1st quarter, but two more Iowa State scores before the half put the Cyclones ahead for the rest of the game. Both offenses ground to a halt in the 4th quarter as the Cornhuskers failed to overcome the 21–24 deficit and were handed their second loss of the season.

=== Colorado ===
#7 Colorado at #18 Nebraska [box score]

Team	1	2	3	4	Total
#7 Colorado	7	8	0	0	15
• #18 Nebraska	3	13	3	14	33

- Date: 1977-10-22
- Location: Memorial Stadium, Lincoln, Nebraska
- Game attendance: 76,486

The season of upsets for and against Nebraska continued, as the #7 Colorado team arrived in Lincoln to be dealt its first loss of the season. One of the two Colorado scores came on a 98-yard kickoff return, but after the half it was all Nebraska as the Cornhuskers piled up 390 yards on the ground and 480 in total.

=== Oklahoma State ===
#12 Nebraska at Oklahoma State [box score]

Team	1	2	3	4	Total
• #12 Nebraska	0	14	14	3	31
Oklahoma State	7	0	0	7	14

- Date: 1977-10-29
- Location: Lewis Field, Stillwater, Oklahoma
- Game attendance: 49,100

Nebraska owned the edge in all facets, leading 74–63 through the air and 318–196 on the ground. Although the Cornhuskers didn't see the scoreboard until the 2nd quarter, they quickly took the lead with help from the Blackshirts, as the Cowboys soon found themselves too far behind to pose any further threat to Nebraska.

=== Missouri ===
#11 Nebraska at Missouri [box score]

Team	1	2	3	4	Total
• #11 Nebraska	9	0	6	6	21
Missouri	0	10	0	0	10

- Date: 1977-11-05
- Location: Faurot Field, Columbia, Missouri
- Game attendance: 67,000

Once again the Blackshirts helped carry the day to make up for repeated turnovers, along with help from Nebraska PK Billy Todd, who created some breathing room by accounting for 9 of the 11 points that separated the Cornhuskers from the Tigers at the final whistle.

=== Kansas ===
Kansas at #12 Nebraska [box score]

Team	1	2	3	4	Total
Kansas	0	0	0	7	7
• #12 Nebraska	14	14	10	14	52

- Date: 1977-11-12
- Location: Memorial Stadium, Lincoln, Nebraska
- Game attendance: 76,392

Nebraska steamrolled Kansas in Lincoln to close out the home schedule, setting records all over in the process. Cornhusker PK Billy Todd set a new Nebraska record for field goals in a season with his 12th and tied a 55-yard longest Nebraska field goal record set in 1969, while the offense set a new single-game rushing record at 550 yards. The Jayhawks' only score came in the 4th quarter against reserves.

=== Oklahoma ===
#11 Nebraska at #3 Oklahoma [box score]

Team	1	2	3	4	Total
#11 Nebraska	0	7	0	0	7
• #3 Oklahoma	0	21	3	14	38

- Date: 1977-11-25
- Location: Oklahoma Memorial Stadium, Norman, Oklahoma
- Game attendance: 71,184

Both teams struggled to put points up to start out, but adjustments made by Oklahoma, with help from inopportune turnovers by Nebraska, led to a Sooner halftime lead of 21–7. The Cornhuskers never were able to get consistent production after that and never saw the scoreboard again as Oklahoma had little trouble padding their lead by an additional 17 points to secure their 6th straight win over Nebraska.

=== North Carolina ===
#12 Nebraska vs #14 North Carolina [box score]

Team	1	2	3	4	Total
• #12 Nebraska	0	7	0	14	21
#14 North Carolina	0	14	3	0	17

- Date: 1977-12-19
- Location: Liberty Bowl Memorial Stadium, Memphis, Tennessee
- Game attendance: 49,456

Nebraska survived a scare when they came from behind, lagging North Carolina 7–17 at the start of the 4th quarter, to post two straight touchdowns for the lead and the win. Nebraska was the only team to score more than 14 against the Tar Heels all year, as North Carolina led the nation in scoring defense and had held opponents to an average of under 8 points per game. It was backup Nebraska QB Randy Garcia who provided the late spark for the Cornhuskers as he came off the bench and directed the two touchdown drives that put Nebraska ahead with just 3:16 left to play, putting away the game and closing the door on the Tar Heels' bid for an upset.

== Rankings ==
Ranking movements Legend: ██ Increase in ranking ██ Decrease in ranking — = Not ranked
	Week													
Poll	Pre	1	2	3	4	5	6	7	8	9	10	11	12	Final
AP	15	—	14	11	9	9	18	12	11	12	11	11	12	12
Coaches														10

== Awards ==
Award	Name(s)
All-America 1st team	Tom Davis
All-America 2nd team	Greg Jorgensen, I.M. Hipp
All-America honorable mention	Ken Spaeth, Kelvin Clark, Lee Kunz, Ted Harvey
All-Big 8 1st team	Tom Davis, Greg Jorgensen, I.M. Hipp, Jim Pillen
All-Big 8 2nd team	Rick Berns, Kelvin Clark, Ted Harvey, Lee Kunz, Steve Lindquist, Ken Spaeth, Stan Waldemore
All-Big 8 honorable mention	George Andrews, Tony Samuel, Tom Sorley

=== NFL and pro players ===
The following Nebraska players who participated in the 1977 season later moved on to the next level and joined a professional or semi-pro team as draftees or free agents.

Name	Team
George Andrews	Los Angeles Rams
Bill Barnett	Miami Dolphins
Rick Berns	Tampa Bay Buccaneers
Ed Burns	New Orleans Saints
Kelvin Clark	Denver Broncos
Barney Cotton	Cincinnati Bengals
Tom Davis	Toronto Argonauts
Andra Franklin	Miami Dolphins
Mark Goodspeed	St. Louis Cardinals
Rod Horn	Cincinnati Bengals
Lee Kunz	Chicago Bears
Jeff Lee	St. Louis Cardinals
Oudious Lee	St. Louis Cardinals
Frank Lockett	Boston Breakers
Junior Miller	Atlanta Falcons
Brett Moritz	Tampa Bay Buccaneers
Derrie Nelson	San Diego Chargers
Jeff Quinn	Pittsburgh Steelers
Stan Waldemore	New York Jets
