= 1977 Colorado Buffaloes football team =

American college football season

1977 Colorado Buffaloes football
- Conference: Big Eight Conference
- Record: 7–3–1 (3–3–1 Big 8)
- Head coach: Bill Mallory (4th season)
- Offensive coordinator: George Belu (4th season)
- Offensive scheme: I formation
- Defensive coordinator: Bob Reublin (4th season)
- Base defense: 5–2
- MVP: James Mayberry
- Captains: Brian Cabral; Tom Perry; Leon White
- Home stadium: Folsom Field

1977 Big Eight Conference football standings
	Conf.					Overall
Team	W		L		T	W		L		T
No. 7 Oklahoma $	7	–	0	–	0	10	–	2	–	0
Iowa State	5	–	2	–	0	8	–	4	–	0
No. 12 Nebraska	5	–	2	–	0	9	–	3	–	0
Colorado	3	–	3	–	1	7	–	3	–	1
Missouri	3	–	4	–	0	4	–	7	–	0
Kansas	2	–	4	–	1	4	–	6	–	1
Oklahoma State	2	–	5	–	0	4	–	7	–	0
Kansas State	0	–	7	–	0	2	–	9	–	0
$ – Conference champion; Rankings from AP Poll

The 1977 Colorado Buffaloes football team represented the University of Colorado Boulder in the Big Eight Conference during the 1977 NCAA Division I football season. Led by fourth-year head coach Bill Mallory, the Buffaloes were 7–3–1 overall and 3–3–1 in the Big 8.

Colorado was a defending conference co-champion and won its first five games to reach third in the polls in October, its highest rank in five years. A disappointing 2–3–1 finish knocked them out of a bowl berth.

== Schedule ==
Date	Opponent	Rank	Site	TV	Result	Attendance	Source
September 10	Stanford*	No. 12	Folsom Field; Boulder, CO		W 27–21	50,482	
September 17	Kent State*	No. 12	Folsom Field; Boulder, CO		W 42–0	46,164	
September 24	New Mexico*	No. 8	Folsom Field; Boulder, CO		W 42–7	47,152	
October 1	at Army*	No. 7	Michie Stadium; West Point, NY		W 31–0	34,548	
October 8	Oklahoma State	No. 6	Folsom Field; Boulder, CO		W 29–13	52,904	
October 15	at Kansas	No. 3	Memorial Stadium; Lawrence, KS		T 17–17	39,320	
October 22	at No. 18 Nebraska	No. 7	Memorial Stadium; Lincoln, NE (rivalry)		L 15–33	76,486	
October 29	Missouri^{†}	No. 15	Folsom Field; Boulder, CI		L 14–24	52,908	
November 5	at No. 19 Iowa State		Cyclone Stadium; Ames, IA		W 12–7	50,000	
November 12	at No. 3 Oklahoma		Oklahoma Memorial Stadium; Norman, OK	ABC	L 14–52	71,184	
November 19	Kansas State		Folsom Field; Boulder, CO (rivalry)		W 23–0	43,873	
*Non-conference game; ^{†}Homecoming; Rankings from AP Poll released prior to the game

== Roster ==
1977 Colorado Buffaloes football team roster
Players
Coaches
Offense

Pos.	#	Name	Class
WR	1	Steve Gaunty	Jr
QB	8	Bill Solomon	So
RB	21	Mike Kozlowski	Jr
QB	12	Jeff Knapple	Jr
RB	39	James Mayberry	Jr
OT	79	Stan Brock	So

Defense

Pos.	#	Name	Class
LB	49	Brian Cabral	Sr
CB	44	Mark Haynes	So
DB	28	Odis McKinney	Sr
DE	80	Randy Westendorf	Sr

Special teams

Pos.	#	Name	Class

Head coach

- Bill Mallory (4th year)

Coordinators/assistant coaches

Legend

- (C) Team captain
- (S) Suspended
- (I) Ineligible
- Injured
- Redshirt

Roster
