= Christopher Hudgens =

American painter

Christopher Hudgens (born December 13, 1977) is an American artist working in Chicago, Illinois.

== History ==
Hudgens was born in Houston, Texas. He was raised in Bacliff, Texas, for ten years and later moved to three cities in North Carolina, St. Louis, Missouri, Chicago, Carbondale, Illinois, and Detroit, Michigan. His work has been largely shown in Chicago, St. Louis, and Detroit. His work in Chicago with Bad at Sports as the Operations Manager, Bridge Art Fair as Business Operations Manager and other work in the Chicago art scene with groups like Literago, Make Magazine, The Parlor and Madhatters Ball gave the base for his reputation in the Chicago arts as a competent project manager and technology adviser for the independent art world. Hudgens received his BFA from Southern Illinois University.

== Exhibitions and events ==
Hudgens has been active nationally since 1996 and internationally as an artist since 2007, and has won various awards, publications and exhibitions. As an art organizer, he is a frequent contributor to Chicago's Bad at Sports as well as Operations Manager. His work with the Bridge Art Fair up until the company closed in 2009 included shows in London, Miami Beach, New York City, and Berlin, helping to create shows that had yearly attendances over 100,000 and revenue over US$4,000,000.
