= Bud Moore (American football) =

American football player and coach (1939–2026)

Biographical details
- Born: October 16, 1939; Jasper, Alabama, U.S.
- Died: February 2, 2026 (aged 86); Tennessee, U.S.

Playing career
- 1958–1960: Alabama
- Position: End

Coaching career (HC unless noted)
- 1961: Gadsden HS (AL) (assistant)
- 1962–1964: Kentucky (OL)
- 1965–1970: Texas A&M (OC)
- 1971: North Carolina (OL)
- 1972–1973: Alabama (RB)
- 1974: Alabama (OC)
- 1975–1978: Kansas

Head coaching record
- Overall: 18–26–1
- Bowls: 0–1

Accomplishments and honors

Awards
- Big Eight Coach of the Year (1975)

Robert W. "Bud" Moore (October 16, 1939 – February 2, 2026) was an American college football player and coach. He served as the head coach at the University of Kansas from 1975 to 1978, compiling a record of 18–26–1. In his first season in 1975, Moore was named Big Eight Coach of the Year and was runner-up to Woody Hayes of Ohio State as the Football Writers Association of America National Coach of the Year. Moore led his team to a 23–3 upset over eventual national champion Oklahoma, breaking the Sooners' 37-game unbeaten streak and handing coach Barry Switzer his first loss.

== Playing career ==
Moore was a native Birmingham, Alabama, where he attended West End High School. He played football at the University of Alabama under Bear Bryant from 1958–1960, earning three varsity letters.

== Coaching career ==
Moore's first coaching job out of college was as an assistant at Gadsden High School in Gadsden, Alabama in 1961. He left that job in 1962 to join Charlie Bradshaw's staff at the University of Kentucky as offensive line coach. He departed Kentucky after the 1964 season to become offensive coordinator at Texas A&M University under new head coach Gene Stallings. Moore left Texas A&M in early 1971 to become offensive line coach at the University of North Carolina at Chapel Hill under Bill Dooley. Moore replaced Jimmy Vickers, who departed to take the same job at the University of Georgia. Moore returned to Alabama in 1972 to coach the offensive backfield under Bryant, and was named offensive coordinator for the 1974 season. Following the 1974 season, he was hired as the head coach at the University of Kansas, succeeding Don Fambrough.

The Jayhawks switched to the wishbone formation when Moore came to Lawrence. Kansas' wishbone was piloted by quarterback Nolan Cromwell, who was named 1975 Big Eight Offensive Player of the Year and later went on to an 11-year Pro Bowl career as a defensive back with the Los Angeles Rams. In 1976, the Jayhawks started 4-0 and were ranked 8th in the AP poll (the last time they would be ranked in 17 years), but after QB Cromwell suffered a season-ending knee injury against Oklahoma, KU finished 6–5. Moore was the first KU coach with back-to-back winning seasons since Jack Mitchell in 1961-62, but this success was followed by 4–6–1 in 1977 and then 1–10 in 1978. In spite of dominating rivals Missouri and Kansas State, these struggles, failure to improve facilities, plus lagging attendance, led to Moore's firing as head coach after four seasons.

After retiring from coaching, Moore entered private business. In 1994, he was honored on National Philanthropy Day by the West Florida chapter of the Association of Fundraising Professionals. He has been active in bird dog field trials and showing Tennessee Walking Horses, having raised and owned multiple national champions in both venues. He received the Paul W. Bryant Alumni-Athlete Award in 1995. The award is given to a former University of Alabama athlete in recognition of character, contribution to society, professional achievement, and service to fellow man. Moore is a member of the University of Kansas Athletics Hall of Fame, and in 2019 was inducted into the Alabama Sports Hall of Fame.

== Death ==
Moore died at his farm in Tennessee on February 2, 2026, at the age of 86.

== Head coaching record ==
Year	Team	Overall	Conference	Standing	Bowl/playoffs
Kansas Jayhawks (Big Eight Conference) (1975–1978)
1975	Kansas	7–5	4–3	4th	L Sun
1976	Kansas	6–5	2–5	7th	
1977	Kansas	4–6–1	2–4–1	6th	
1978	Kansas	1–10	0–7	8th	
Kansas:		18–26–1	8–19–1		
Total:		18–26–1			
