= 1977 Peach Bowl =

American college football game

- 10th Peach Bowl
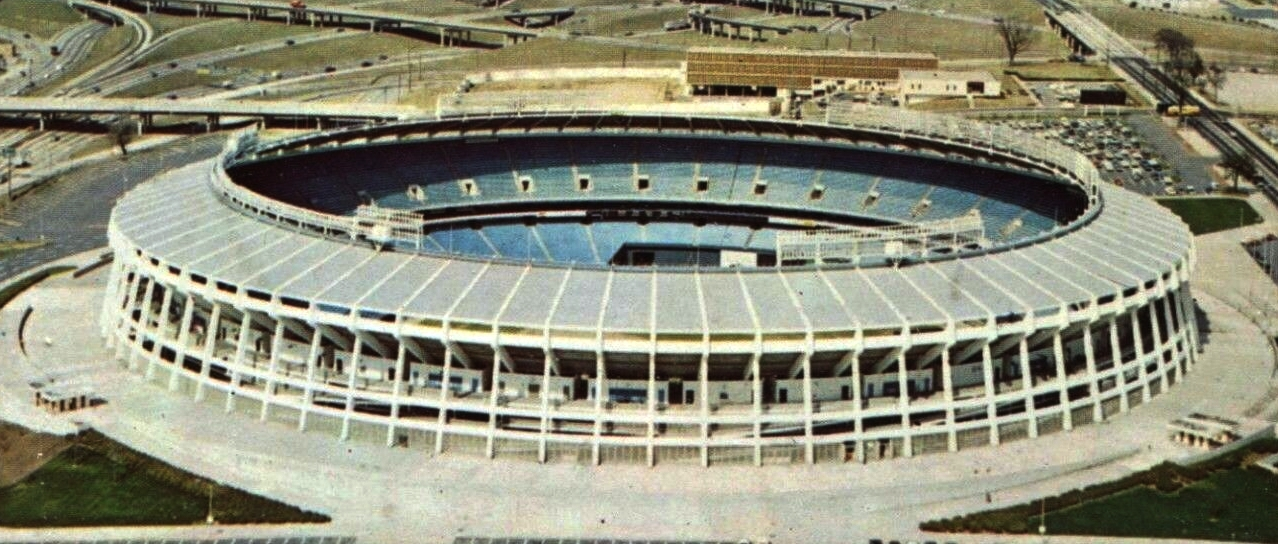
- Atlanta–Fulton County Stadium in Atlanta, Georgia, hosted the Peach Bowl.
Iowa State Cyclones	NC State Wolfpack
(8–3)	(7–4)
Big Eight	ACC
14	24
Head coach: Earle Bruce	Head coach: Bo Rein
AP / Coaches; NR / 14
	1	2	3	4	Total
Iowa State	0	0	0	14	14
NC State	7	14	0	3	24
- Date: December 31, 1977
- Season: 1977
- Stadium: Atlanta–Fulton County Stadium
- Location: Atlanta, Georgia
- MVP: QB Johnny Evans; DB Richard Carter
- Referee: Robert Bertha
- Attendance: 36,733

The 1977 Peach Bowl was a college football postseason bowl game between the Iowa State Cyclones and the NC State Wolfpack.

== Background ==
This was Iowa State's third bowl game in the decade, after tying for 2nd in the Big Eight Conference, and first ever Peach Bowl. This was NC State's fifth bowl game in the decade and first Peach Bowl since 1975, after tying for 3rd in the Atlantic Coast Conference.

== Game summary ==
Johnny Evans threw for 202 yards and ran for 62 yards. Ted Brown rushed for 114 yards, his second 100-yard performance in a Peach Bowl.| source =

== Aftermath ==
After the game, NC State was ranked 19th in the final Coaches Poll. The Wolfpack did not play in another Peach Bowl until 1986. The Cyclones have not returned to a Peach Bowl since this game.
