= 1977 Iowa State Cyclones football team =

American college football season

1977 Iowa State Cyclones football

Peach Bowl, L 14–24 vs. NC State
- Conference: Big Eight Conference
- Record: 8–4 (5–2 Big 8)
- Head coach: Earle Bruce (5th season)
- Defensive coordinator: Pete Rodriguez (2nd season)
- Home stadium: Cyclone Stadium

1977 Big Eight Conference football standings
	Conf.					Overall
Team	W		L		T	W		L		T
No. 7 Oklahoma $	7	–	0	–	0	10	–	2	–	0
Iowa State	5	–	2	–	0	8	–	4	–	0
No. 12 Nebraska	5	–	2	–	0	9	–	3	–	0
Colorado	3	–	3	–	1	7	–	3	–	1
Missouri	3	–	4	–	0	4	–	7	–	0
Kansas	2	–	4	–	1	4	–	6	–	1
Oklahoma State	2	–	5	–	0	4	–	7	–	0
Kansas State	0	–	7	–	0	2	–	9	–	0
$ – Conference champion; Rankings from AP Poll

The 1977 Iowa State Cyclones football team represented Iowa State University during the 1977 NCAA Division I football season as a member of the Big Eight Conference (Big 8). The team was led by head coach Earle Bruce, in his fifth year, and they played their home games at Cyclone Stadium in Ames, Iowa. They finished the season with a record of eight wins and four losses (8–4, 5–2 Big 8), which included a loss to NC State in the Peach Bowl.

== Schedule ==
Date	Time	Opponent	Rank	Site	TV	Result	Attendance	Source
September 10	1:30 pm	Wichita State*		Cyclone Stadium; Ames, IA		W 35–9	37,071	
September 17	12:50 pm	at Iowa*		Kinnick Stadium; Iowa City, IA (rivalry)	ABC	L 10–12	57,988	
September 24	2:30 pm	at Bowling Green*		Doyt Perry Stadium; Bowling Green, OH		W 35–21	14,102	
October 1	1:30 pm	Dayton*		Cyclone Stadium; Ames, IA		W 17–13	40,850	
October 8	1:30 pm	Missouri		Cyclone Stadium; Ames, IA (rivalry)		W 7–0	48,000	
October 15	1:30 pm	at No. 9 Nebraska		Memorial Stadium; Lincoln, NE (rivalry)		W 24–21	76,090	
October 22	1:30 pm	at No. 6 Oklahoma	No. 16	Oklahoma Memorial Stadium; Norman, OK		L 16–35	71,184	
October 29	1:30 pm	Kansas^{†}		Cyclone Stadium; Ames, IA		W 41–3	48,500	
November 5	1:30 pm	Colorado	No. 19	Cyclone Stadium; Ames, IA		L 7–12	50,000	
November 12	1:30 pm	at Kansas State		KSU Stadium; Manhattan, KS (rivalry)		W 22–15	21,800	
November 19	1:30 pm	Oklahoma State		Cyclone Stadium; Ames, IA		W 21–13	38,500	
December 31	11:00 am	vs. NC State*		Atlanta–Fulton County Stadium; Atlanta, GA (Peach Bowl)	MTN	L 14–24	37,733	
*Non-conference game; ^{†}Homecoming; Rankings from AP Poll released prior to the game; All times are in Central time

== Game summaries ==
=== At Iowa ===
Iowa State at Iowa

Team	1	2	3	4	Total
Cyclones	7	3	0	0	10
• Hawkeyes	12	0	0	0	12

- Date: Saturday, September 17
- Location: Kinnick Stadium, Iowa City, Iowa
- Game attendance: 59,725
- Television network: ABC
- Source: Palm Beach Post

Scoring summary
1	ISU	Buck 63 yard punt return (Kollman kick)	ISU 7-0
1	IOWA	Mosely 77 yard run (kick failed)	ISU 7-6
1	IOWA	Lazar 10 yard run (run failed)	IOWA 12-7
2	ISU	Kollman 42 yard field goal	IOWA 12-10

=== At Nebraska ===
Iowa State at #9 Nebraska

Team	1	2	3	4	Total
• Cyclones	7	14	3	0	24
No. 9 Cornhuskers	14	0	7	0	21

- Date: October 15
- Location: Memorial Stadium, Lincoln, Nebraska
- Game attendance: 76,090

=== At Oklahoma ===
Team	1	2	3	4	Total
No. 16 Cyclones	9	0	7	0	16
• No. 6 Sooners	7	7	7	14	35

- Date: October 22
- Location: Oklahoma Memorial Stadium
- Game attendance: 71,184

== Roster ==
1977 Iowa State Cyclones football team roster
Players
Coaches
Offense

Pos.	#	Name	Class
C	56	Mark Boehm	Jr
WR	25	Tom Buck	So
QB		Vinny Cerrato
RB		Frank Cooper
RB	32	Cal Cummins	Sr
G	68	Kevin Cunningham	Sr
RB	21	Jeff Curry	Jr
OT	66	Dick Cuvelier	So
RB	24	Dexter Green	Jr
G	70	Al Grissinger	Jr
WR	29	Ray Hardee	Jr
WR	41	Stan Hixon	Jr
RB	43	Pat Kennedy	So
TE	84	Mickey Leafblad	Jr
OT	76	Brian Neal	Fr
TE	88	Guy Preston	Sr
QB		John Quinn
QB	11	Terry Rubley	So
RB		Jack Seabrooke
WR	28	John Solomon	Sr
RB		Yogi Stevens
QB	10	Mike Tryon	Sr

Defense

Pos.	#	Name	Class
LB	96	Tom Boskey	Jr
CB	34	Mike Clemons	Jr
CB	7	Kevin Hart	Sr
DL	61	Ron McFarland	Sr
DB	33	Tom Perticone	Jr
DL	64	Tom Randall	Sr
DL	71	Greg Rensink	So
S	26	Mike Schwartz	So
LB	57	Mark Settle	Sr
DL	63	Mike Stensrud	Jr
DL	52	Craig Volkens	Sr
CB	17	Jerry Washington	Jr
DL	92	Rick White	Jr

Special teams

Pos.	#	Name	Class
P	35	Rick Blabolil	Sr
K	5	Scott Kollman	Sr

Head coach

- Earle Bruce

Coordinators/assistant coaches

- Tom Lichtenberg (OC/QB)
- Pete Rodriguez (DC)
- Dave Triplett (TE)
- Tommy Vaughn (RB)
- Jim Williams (OL)

Legend

- (C) Team captain
- (S) Suspended
- (I) Ineligible
- Injured
- Redshirt
