= Kirby Criswell =

American football player (born 1957)

No. 63
- Position: Linebacker

Personal information
- Born: August 31, 1957 (age 69); Grinnell, Iowa, U.S.
- Listed height: 6 ft 5 in (1.96 m)
- Listed weight: 238 lb (108 kg)

Career information
- High school: Grinnell
- College: Kansas
- NFL draft: 1980: 2nd round, 31st overall pick

Career history
- Cincinnati Bengals (1980)*; Green Bay Packers (1980)*; St. Louis Cardinals (1980-1981)
- * Offseason or practice squad member only
- Stats at Pro Football Reference

Kirby Lynn Criswell (born August 31, 1957) is an American former professional football player who was a linebacker for the St. Louis Cardinals of the National Football League (NFL). He was selected in the second round of the 1980 NFL draft.

== Football career ==
Criswell was born and raised in Grinnell, Iowa, where he attended Grinnell High School. A standout in high school, Criswell was recruited to play collegiate football by several universities. He elected to play for the University of Kansas. The Jayhawks did not produce any strong teams during his time with them, but Criswell was noticed due to his passionate style of play. He was selected 31st overall by the Cincinnati Bengals in the second round of the 1980 NFL draft. Criswell, who sported a Mohawk hairstyle during training camp, was waived by the Bengals before the start of 1980 football season but then signed by Green Bay. Green Bay cut Criswell two days later.

It was late in the 1980 NFL Season when Criswell was signed by the St. Louis Cardinals. He did manage to get into four games for St. Louis that year. A broken arm kept Criswell off the Cardinals active list for most of the 1981 season. St. Louis signed Criswell to another contract early in 1982.

Less than a month after his signing, Criswell was arrested on federal drug charges. On June 2, 1982, Criswell was found guilty by a federal jury of possessing marijuana and conspiring to manufacture and distribute methamphetamine. He was subsequently sentenced to five years in prison. After his sentencing, Criswell said a recently published Sports Illustrated article on Don Reese may have hurt his cause.

Criswell never played in the NFL again.
