= Carl Reese (American football) =

American football coach (1943–2025)

Biographical details
- Born: June 15, 1943; Springfield, Missouri, U.S.
- Died: September 25, 2025 (aged 82); Hattiesburg, Mississippi, U.S.

Playing career
- 1963–1965: Missouri
- Positions: Fullback, linebacker

Coaching career (HC unless noted)
- 1966: Missouri (GA)
- 1967–1968: Northern Michigan (DB)
- 1969: Southern Illinois (def. asst.)
- 1970–1973: East Carolina (DC)
- 1974: Virginia (AHC/DC)
- 1975–1976: Kansas (LB)
- 1977–1982: Missouri (DC)
- 1983–1985: Birmingham Stallions (DC)
- 1986–1988: Missouri (DC)
- 1989–1990: Navy (DC)
- 1991–1994: Vanderbilt (DC)
- 1995–1997: LSU (DC)
- 1998–2003: Texas (DC)
- 2009–2010: Miami (OH) (DC)
- 2015: Arkansas (Analyst)

Carl DeWayne "Bull" Reese (June 15, 1943 – September 25, 2025) was an American college football coach. Reese served as defensive coordinator for 31 years at six different schools and one season professionally in the United States Football League (USFL). In 2009, he accepted the defensive coordinator position at Miami (Ohio), under new head coach Michael Haywood. Reese and Haywood worked together previously at LSU in the 1990s.

While at Texas, Reese inherited a defense that ranked 104th nationally in rushing (241.5 ypg) and 85th nationally in total defense (399.2 ypg) in 1997 and turned it into a unit that produced five straight top 25 total defense finishes. Texas' NCAA-leading 236.2 yards per game allowed in 2001 was the Horns' lowest since 1983 (212.0 ypg). He was a 2001 finalist for the Broyles Award, given to the nation's top assistant coach. UT ranked sixth nationally in total defense in 1999 (286.7 ypg), seventh in 2000 (278.3 ypg) and 16th in 2002 (307.7 ypg).

In 2015, Reese joined Arkansas Razorbacks staff serving as an analyst for the team.

Reese died of complications of Alzheimer’s disease in Hattiesburg, Mississippi, on September 25, 2025, at the age of 82.
