= Milton Hardaway =

American football player (1954-2008)

No. 77
- Position: Tackle

Personal information
- Born: December 12, 1954; Seguin, Texas, U.S.
- Died: August 13, 2008 (aged 53); Seguin, Texas, U.S.
- Listed height: 6 ft 9 in (2.06 m)
- Listed weight: 309 lb (140 kg)

Career information
- High school: Seguin
- College: Blinn JC (1974–1975); Oklahoma State (1976–1977)
- NFL draft: 1978: 2nd round, 41st overall pick

Career history
- San Diego Chargers (1978–1979)

Career NFL statistics
- Games played: 12
- Stats at Pro Football Reference

Milton Buddy Hardaway Jr. (December 12, 1954 – August 13, 2008) was an American professional football tackle who played for the San Diego Chargers of the National Football League (NFL). He played college football at Oklahoma State University–Stillwater.
