= Dean Blevins =

American sportscaster (born 1955)

- Born: 1955 (age 70–71); Norman, Oklahoma, U.S.
- Education: University of Oklahoma
- Occupation: Sportscaster
- Employer: KWTV (2001–2025)

Dean Blevins (born approximately 1955) is an American sportscaster. He served as the sports director for KWTV, the CBS affiliate in Oklahoma City, Oklahoma from 2001 until July 1, 2025. He also is a co-host of an afternoon radio show on the Sports Animal called "The Total Dominance Hour" and he hosts the weekly Brent Venables Show.

== Broadcast career ==
He has been awarded two Emmy Awards for his journalism. He has won "Sportscaster of the Year" eight times. He was voted one of the "Ten Best-Dressed Men in Sports" by Sport magazine.

Blevins has announced college football and basketball games for 25 years, including 14 years for ABC, CBS, and ESPN. Some of his assignments included major bowl games as part of the Bowl Championship Series. He also has done some PPV work for Fox Sports Net. Blevins worked as the sports director for ABC affiliate KOCO-TV in Oklahoma City from 1988 to 1994. Blevins joined KWTV in 1998, as the co-host of the then-newly created Sunday sports program The Final Score (which was reformatted as the current Oklahoma Sports Blitz in 2001); however in the spring of 2001, after the death of KWTV sports director Bill Teegins in a Colorado plane crash that killed nine other players and faculty members of Oklahoma State University, Blevins was appointed as Teegins' replacement as the station's sports director and lead sports anchor. Since 1985 he has hosted shows for recognizable sports personalities and coaches including Barry Switzer, Jerry Jones and Eddie Sutton. He hosted two weekly TV shows for former Oklahoma football coach Bob Stoops from 1999 until 2017. In 2013, Blevins came under fire for what many perceived as a racist tweet. The tweet read "Happy we are the Melting Pot. Will be happier...if ppl who pour into our pot & sell me fuel & Milk Duds find time to learn our language" In 2007, Dean was the subject of criticism after making a radio appearance during the Total Dominance Hour on the Sports Animal while urinating. Dean admitted that he was sedated due to pain medication from a recent surgery.

== Sports career ==
Blevins grew up in Norman, Oklahoma and was an all-state athlete in football, basketball, and track while in high school. He was voted the winner of the "Oklahoma High School Athlete of the Year" by the Jim Thorpe Association in 1974 and by the Oklahoma High School Coaches Association. He was also voted Basketball Player of the Year by the Tulsa Tribune. Blevins then attended the University of Oklahoma, where he played football and basketball. He played quarterback on the Oklahoma Sooners football teams in 1974 and 1975 and on four Big 8 Conference championship teams from 1974 to 1977. In 1975, he won the Jay Meyer award as the top scholar athlete at OU.
