= Dave Hudgens (American football) =

American football player (born 1955)

Profile
- Position: Defensive tackle

Personal information
- Born: February 27, 1955 (age 71); San Diego, California, U.S.
- Listed height: 6 ft 5 in (1.96 m)
- Listed weight: 235 lb (107 kg)

Career information
- High school: Will Rogers (OK)
- College: Oklahoma
- NFL draft: 1978: 3rd round, 84th overall pick

Career history
- Dallas Cowboys (1978)

Awards and highlights
- 2× National champion (1974, 1975)

Dave Hudgens (born February 27, 1955) is an American former professional football player who was a defensive tackle for the Dallas Cowboys of the National Football League (NFL). He played college football for the Oklahoma Sooners.

== Early life ==
Hudgens attended Will Rogers High School before moving on to the University of Oklahoma. As a sophomore in 1975, he found initial success as an individual Big Eight Conference champion in the shot put.

Playing defensive tackle in football, he became a starter in the last 4 games of his junior season. As a senior, he was considered the strongest player on the team and posted 37 tackles (4 for loss). He was also known for his big plays against the University of Texas and Ohio State University.

== Professional career ==
Hudgens was selected by the Dallas Cowboys in the third round (84th overall) of the 1978 NFL draft, with the intention of converting him into an offensive lineman. As a rookie, he injured his right knee in training camp and was placed on the injured reserve list. He was waived on August 14, 1979.
