= Iowa State Cyclones football statistical leaders =

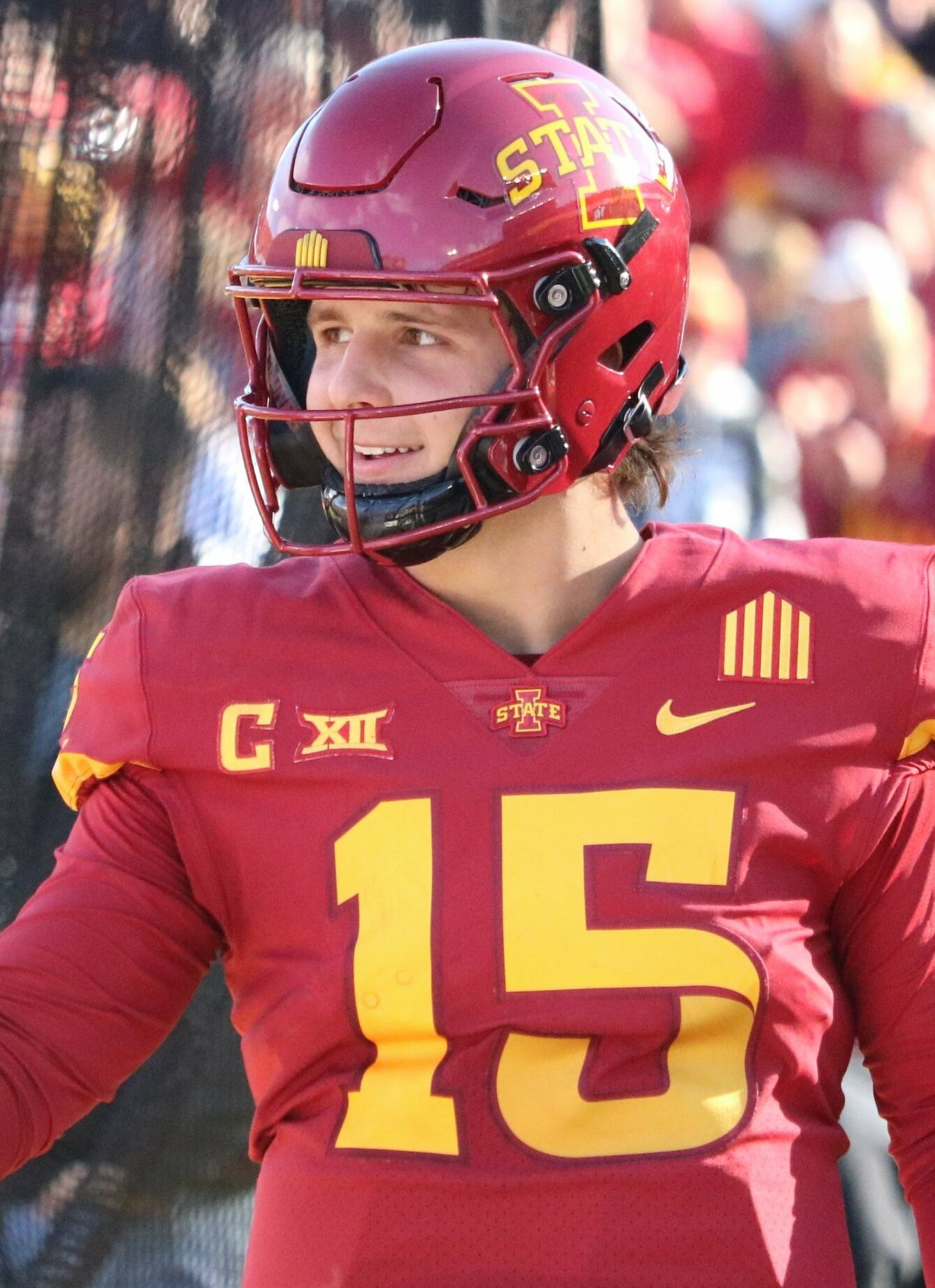
Quarterback Brock Purdy holds all passing and total yards records for the Cyclones.

The Iowa State Cyclones football statistical leaders are individual statistical leaders of the Iowa State Cyclones football program in various categories, including passing, rushing, total offense, and receiving, and defensive stats. Within those areas, the lists identify single-game, single-season, and career leaders. The Cyclones represent Iowa State University in the NCAA Division I FBS Big 12 Conference.

Although Iowa State began competing in intercollegiate football in 1892, the school's official record book considers the "modern era" to have begun in 1943. Records from before this year are often incomplete and inconsistent, and they are generally not included in these lists.

These lists are dominated by more recent players for several reasons:

- Since 1943, seasons have increased from 10 games to 11 and then 12 games in length.
- The NCAA didn't allow freshmen to play varsity football until 1972 (with the exception of the World War II years), allowing players to have four-year careers.
- Since 2018, players have been allowed to participate in as many as four games in a redshirt season; previously, playing in even one game "burned" the redshirt. Since 2024, postseason games have not counted against the four-game limit. These changes to redshirt rules have given very recent players several extra games to accumulate statistics.
- Bowl games only began counting toward single-season and career statistics in 2002. The Cyclones have played in six bowl games since then.
- The Big 12 has played a championship game during two different periods—first from 1996 to 2010, and more recently since 2017. The Cyclones have played in this game twice (2020 and 2024), giving players in those seasons an extra game to amass statistics.
- Due to COVID-19 issues, the NCAA ruled that the 2020 season would not count against the athletic eligibility of any football player, giving everyone who played in that season the opportunity for five years of eligibility instead of the normal four.
- Six of the Cyclones' nine highest seasons in total offensive yards have come since 2000.

These lists are updated through Week 12 of the 2026 season. Currently active players are in bold.

== Passing ==
=== Passing yards ===
Career
Rank	Player	Yards	Years
1	Brock Purdy	12,170	2018 2019 2020 2021
2	Bret Meyer	9,499	2004 2005 2006 2007
3	Rocco Becht	9,274	2022 2023 2024 2025
4	Austen Arnaud	6,777	2007 2008 2009 2010
5	Sam B. Richardson	6,050	2012 2013 2014 2015
6	Alex Espinoza	5,307	1984 1985 1986
7	Seneca Wallace	5,289	2001 2002
8	Todd Bandhauer	5,235	1995 1996 1997 1998
9	Sage Rosenfels	4,164	1997 1998 1999 2000
10	David Archer	4,104	1982 1983

Single season
Rank	Player	Yards	Year
1	Brock Purdy	3,982	2019
2	Rocco Becht	3,505	2024
3	Seneca Wallace	3,245	2002
4	Brock Purdy	3,188	2021
5	Rocco Becht	3,120	2023
6	Hunter Dekkers	3,044	2022
7	Bret Meyer	2,876	2005
8	Austen Arnaud	2,792	2008
9	Brock Purdy	2,750	2020
10	Sam B. Richardson	2,669	2014

Single game
Rank	Player	Yards	Year	Opponent
1	Rocco Becht	446	2023	Memphis
2	Austen Arnaud	440	2008	Kansas State
3	Todd Bandhauer	437	1998	Texas
4	Brock Purdy	435	2019	UL Monroe
5	Seneca Wallace	425	2002	Missouri
6	Bret Oberg	411	1989	Oklahoma
7	Rocco Becht	383	2024	Kansas
8	Brock Purdy	382	2019	Oklahoma State
9	Steele Jantz	381	2012	Baylor
10	Brock Purdy	378	2019	Texas Tech

=== Passing touchdowns ===
Career
Rank	Player	TDs	Years
1	Brock Purdy	81	2018 2019 2020 2021
2	Rocco Becht	64	2022 2023 2024 2025
3	Bret Meyer	50	2004 2005 2006 2007
4	Sam B. Richardson	45	2012 2013 2014
5	Austen Arnaud	42	2007 2008 2009 2010
6	Todd Bandhauer	40	1995 1996 1997 1998
7	Alex Espinoza	33	1984 1985 1986
8	Seneca Wallace	26	2001 2002
9	Wayne Stanley	25	1972 1973 1974 1976
	Dean Carlson	25	1970 1971

Single season
Rank	Player	TDs	Year
1	Brock Purdy	27	2019
2	Rocco Becht	25	2024
3	Rocco Becht	23	2023
4	Todd Bandhauer	20	1997
5	Bret Meyer	19	2005
	Brock Purdy	19	2020
	Brock Purdy	19	2021
	Hunter Dekkers	19	2022
9	David Archer	18	1983
	Sam B. Richardson	18	2014

Single game
Rank	Player	TDs	Year	Opponent
1	Todd Bandhauer	5	1998	Texas
	Steele Jantz	5	2012	Baylor
	Brock Purdy	5	2019	Oklahoma
4	Rich Mann	4	1951	Nebraska
	Wayne Stanley	4	1976	Air Force
	Alex Espinoza	4	1986	Kansas State
	Bret Oberg	4	1989	Oklahoma
	Seneca Wallace	4	2001	Baylor
	Bret Meyer	4	2005	Texas A&M
	Austen Arnaud	4	2010	Texas Tech
	Steele Jantz	4	2011	Iowa
	Sam B. Richardson	4	2012	Kansas
	Grant Rohach	4	2013	West Virginia
	Jacob Park	4	2017	Iowa
	Brock Purdy	4	2018	Oklahoma State
	Brock Purdy	4	2019	Kansas
	Brock Purdy	4	2021	Kansas
	Hunter Dekkers	4	2022	SEMO

== Rushing ==
=== Rushing yards ===
Career
Rank	Player	Yards	Years
1	Troy Davis	4,382	1994 1995 1996
2	Breece Hall	3,941	2019 2020 2021
3	Darren Davis	3,763	1996 1997 1998 1999
4	Dexter Green	3,585	1975 1976 1977 1978
5	Alexander Robinson	3,309	2007 2008 2009 2010
6	Mike Strachan	3,058	1972 1973 1974
7	David Montgomery	2,925	2016 2017 2018
8	Ennis Haywood	2,862	1998 1999 2000 2001
9	Joe Henderson	2,715	1985 1986 1987 1988
10	Stevie Hicks	2,601	2003 2004 2005 2006

Single season
Rank	Player	Yards	Year
1	Troy Davis	2,185	1996
2	Troy Davis	2,010	1995
3	Breece Hall	1,572	2020
4	Blaise Bryant	1,516	1989
5	**Aiden Flora**	1,506	2026
6	Breece Hall	1,472	2021
7	Darren Davis	1,388	1999
8	Mike Warren	1,339	2015
9	Dwayne Crutchfield	1,312	1980
10	George Amundson	1,260	1971
	Mike Strachan	1,260	1972

Single game
Rank	Player	Yards	Year	Opponent
1	Troy Davis	378	1996	Missouri
2	Troy Davis	302	1995	UNLV
3	Troy Davis	291	1995	Ohio
4	Abu Sama III	276	2023	Kansas State
5	Dave Hoppmann	271	1961	Kansas State
6	Darren Davis	261	1997	Kansas
7	Darren Davis	247	1997	Baylor
8	Mike Warren	245	2015	Texas Tech
9	Darren Davis	244	1998	Iowa
10	Harold Brown	242	1982	Kent State
	Breece Hall	242	2021	TCU

=== Rushing touchdowns ===
Career
Rank	Player	TDs	Years
1	Breece Hall	50	2019 2020 2021
2	Troy Davis	37	1994 1995 1996
3	Dexter Green	35	1975 1976 1977 1978
4	George Amundson	31	1970 1971 1972
	Blaise Bryant	31	1989 1990
6	Dwayne Crutchfield	28	1980 1981
7	Ennis Haywood	27	1998 1999 2000 2001
	Alexander Robinson	27	2007 2008 2009 2010
9	Darren Davis	26	1996 1997 1998 1999
	David Montgomery	26	2016 2017 2018

Single season
Rank	Player	TDs	Year
1	Troy Davis	21	1996
	Breece Hall	21	2020
3	Breece Hall	20	2021
4	Blaise Bryant	19	1989
5	Dwayne Crutchfield	17	1981
6	Troy Davis	16	1995
7	George Amundson	15	1971
	Dexter Green	15	1977
9	Darren Davis	14	1999
	Ennis Haywood	14	2001
	**Aiden Flora**	14	2026

Single game
Rank	Player	TDs	Year	Opponent
1	Joe Henderson	5	1988	Kansas
	Troy Davis	5	1995	UNLV
	Troy Davis	5	1996	Northern Iowa
	Joel Lanning	5	2016	Texas Tech
5	George Amundson	4	1971	Oklahoma State
	Dwayne Crutchfield	4	1981	Kent State
	Blaise Bryant	4	1990	Northern Iowa
	Troy Davis	4	1996	Missouri
	Ennis Haywood	4	2001	Kansas

== Receiving ==
=== Receptions ===
Career
Rank	Player	Rec	Years
1	Xavier Hutchinson	254	2020 2021 2022
2	Jaylin Noel	245	2021 2022 2023 2024
3	Allen Lazard	241	2014 2015 2016 2017
4	Deshaunte Jones	184	2016 2017 2018 2019
5	Todd Blythe	176	2004 2005 2006 2007
6	Charlie Kolar	168	2018 2019 2020 2021
7	Lane Danielsen	163	2000 2001 2002 2003
8	RJ Sumrall	156	2005 2006 2007 2008
9	Tracy Henderson	150	1982 1983 1984
10	Jayden Higgins	140	2023 2024

Single season
Rank	Player	Rec	Year
1	Xavier Hutchinson	107	2022
2	Jayden Higgins	87	2024
3	Xavier Hutchinson	83	2021
4	Tracy Henderson	81	1983
5	Jaylin Noel	80	2024
6	Deshaunte Jones	76	2019
7	Allen Lazard	71	2017
8	Allen Lazard	69	2016
9	Jaylin Noel	66	2023
10	Jason Jacobs	64	1983
	Tracy Henderson	64	1984
	Xavier Hutchinson	64	2020

Single game
Rank	Player	Rec	Year	Opponent
1	Tracy Henderson	16	1983	Kansas State
2	Deshaunte Jones	14	2019	Northern Iowa
3	Tom Busch	13	1967	Kansas
	Steve Lester	13	1989	Oklahoma
	Xavier Hutchinson	13	2022	Kansas
6	Tracy Henderson	12	1983	Missouri
	Xavier Hutchinson	12	2021	Oklahoma State
	Charlie Kolar	12	2021	Oklahoma
9	Eppie Barney	11	1966	Arizona
	Jason Jacobs	11	1983	Nebraska
	Tracy Henderson	11	1984	Texas A&M
	JJ Moses	11	2000	Nebraska
	Collin Franklin	11	2010	Colorado
	Xavier Hutchinson	11	2022	Iowa

=== Receiving yards ===
Career
Rank	Player	Yards	Years
1	Allen Lazard	3,360	2014 2015 2016 2017
2	Todd Blythe	3,096	2004 2005 2006 2007
3	Xavier Hutchinson	2,929	2020 2021 2022
4	Jaylin Noel	2,851	2021 2022 2023 2024
5	Lane Danielsen	2,690	2000 2001 2002 2003
6	Charlie Kolar	2,181	2018 2019 2020 2021
7	Jayden Higgins	2,166	2023 2024
8	Hakeem Butler	2,149	2016 2017 2018
9	Deshaunte Jones	2,052	2016 2017 2018 2019
10	Tracy Henderson	2,048	1982 1983 1984

Single season
Rank	Player	Yards	Year
1	Hakeem Butler	1,318	2018
2	Jaylin Noel	1,194	2024
3	Jayden Higgins	1,183	2024
4	Xavier Hutchinson	1,171	2022
5	Lane Danielsen	1,073	2002
6	Tracy Henderson	1,051	1983
7	Allen Lazard	1,018	2016
8	Todd Blythe	1,000	2005
9	Xavier Hutchinson	987	2021
10	Jayden Higgins	983	2023

Single game
Rank	Player	Yards	Year	Opponent
1	Tracy Henderson	217	1984	Texas A&M
2	Todd Blythe	214	2005	Texas A&M
	Jayden Higgins	214	2023	Memphis
4	Jim Doran	203	1949	Oklahoma
	Steve Lester	203	1989	Oklahoma
6	Lane Danielsen	192	2003	Texas Tech
	Hakeem Butler	192	2018	Washington State
8	Todd Blythe	188	2004	Nebraska
9	Darius Reynolds	178	2011	Baylor
10	Eppie Barney	175	1966	Arizona
	Tracy Henderson	175	1984	Iowa

=== Receiving touchdowns ===
Career
Rank	Player	TDs	Years
1	Todd Blythe	31	2004 2005 2006 2007
2	Allen Lazard	26	2014 2015 2016 2017
3	Charlie Kolar	23	2018 2019 2020 2021
4	Hakeem Butler	18	2016 2017 2018
	Jaylin Noel	18	2021 2022 2023 2024
6	Keith Krepfle	16	1994 1995 1996 1997
7	Ed Williams	15	1994 1995 1996 1997
	Quenton Bundrage	15	2012 2013 2014 2015
	Xavier Hutchinson	15	2020 2021 2022
	Jayden Higgins	15	2023 2024

Single season
Rank	Player	TDs	Year
1	Allen Lazard	10	2017
2	Todd Blythe	9	2004
	Todd Blythe	9	2005
	Quenton Bundrage	9	2013
	Hakeem Butler	9	2018
	Jayden Higgins	9	2024
7	Tracy Henderson	8	1983
	Tyrone Watley	8	1997
	Todd Blythe	8	2006
	E. J. Bibbs	8	2014
	Jaylin Noel	8	2024

Single game
Rank	Player	TDs	Year	Opponent
1	Todd Blythe	4	2005	Texas A&M
2	George Gast	3	1943	Kansas State
	Jim Doran	3	1950	Missouri
	Damien Groce	3	1998	Texas Tech
	Todd Blythe	3	2004	Northern Illinois
	Josh Lenz	3	2012	TCU
	Jarvis West	3	2012	Baylor
	Quenton Bundrage	3	2013	Iowa
	Xavier Hutchinson	3	2022	SEMO

== Total offense ==
Total offense is the sum of passing and rushing statistics. It does not include receiving or returns.

=== Total offense yards ===
Career
Rank	Player	Yards	Years
1	Brock Purdy	13,347	2018 2019 2020 2021
2	Bret Meyer	10,422	2004 2005 2006 2007
3	Rocco Becht	9,773	2022 2023 2024 2025
4	Austen Arnaud	8,044	2007 2008 2009 2010
5	Sam B. Richardson	7,058	2012 2013 2014 2015
6	Seneca Wallace	6,201	2001 2002
7	Alex Espinoza	5,018	1984 1985 1986
8	Sage Rosenfels	4,824	1997 1998 1999 2000
9	George Amundson	4,798	1970 1971 1972 1972
10	Todd Bandhauer	4,763	1995 1996 1997 1998

Single season
Rank	Player	Yards	Year
1	Brock Purdy	4,231	2019
2	Rocco Becht	3,823	2024
3	Seneca Wallace	3,682	2002
4	Brock Purdy	3,426	2021
5	Austen Arnaud	3,193	2008
6	Rocco Becht	3,183	2023
7	Brock Purdy	3,132	2020
8	Hunter Dekkers	3,117	2022
9	Sam B. Richardson	3,090	2014
10	Bret Meyer	2,999	2005

Single game
Rank	Player	Yards	Year	Opponent
1	Brock Purdy	510	2019	UL-Monroe
2	Seneca Wallace	493	2002	Missouri
	Austen Arnaud	493	2008	Kansas State
4	Jared Barnett	460	2011	Oklahoma State
5	Bret Oberg	449	1989	Oklahoma
6	Rocco Becht	442	2023	Memphis
7	Austen Arnaud	438	2008	Texas A&M
8	Steele Jantz	435	2012	Baylor
9	Todd Bandhauer	427	1998	Texas
10	Brock Purdy	402	2018	Oklahoma State

=== Touchdowns responsible for ===
"Touchdowns responsible for" is the NCAA's official term for combined passing and rushing touchdowns.

Career
Rank	Player	TDs	Years
1	Brock Purdy	100	2018 2019 2020 2021
2	Rocco Becht	83	2022 2023 2024 2025
3	Bret Meyer	62	2004 2005 2006 2007
4	Austen Arnaud	57	2007 2008 2009 2010
5	Breece Hall	56	2019 2020 2021
6	George Amundson	53	1970 1971 1972
7	Sam B. Richardson	51	2012 2013 2014 2015
8	Todd Bandhauer	43	1995 1996 1997 1998
9	Seneca Wallace	41	2001 2002
10	Alex Espinoza	37	1984 1985 1986

Single season
Rank	Player	TDs	Year
1	Brock Purdy	35	2019
2	Rocco Becht	33	2024
3	George Amundson	26	1972
	Rocco Becht	26	2023
5	Brock Purdy	24	2020
	Rocco Becht	24	2025
7	Seneca Wallace	23	2002
	Breece Hall	23	2020
	Breece Hall	23	2021
10	Austen Arnaud	22	2009

Single game
Rank	Player	TDs	Year	Opponent
1	Bret Oberg	6	1989	Oklahoma
	Brock Purdy	6	2019	UL-Monroe
	Brock Purdy	6	2019	Oklahoma

== Defense ==
=== Interceptions ===
Career
Rank	Player	Ints	Years
1	Barry Hill	21	1972 1973 1974
2	Tony Washington	14	1968 1969 1970
3	John Schweizer	12	1970 1971 1972
4	Everett Kischer	11	1936 1937 1938
5	Don Ferguson	10	1947 1948 1949
6	Jeff Simonds	9	1966 1967 1968
	Larry Crawford	9	1977 1978 1979 1980
	Ellis Hobbs	9	2001 2002 2003 2004
9	Andrew Buggs	8	1989 1990 1991 1992
	Marc Timmons	8	2000 2001 2002 2003
	Jake Knott	8	2009 2010 2011 2012
	Jeremiah Cooper	8	2022 2023 2024 2025

Single season
Rank	Player	Ints	Year
1	Barry Hill	9	1974
2	Bob Mellgren	8	1952
	Barry Hill	8	1973
4	Everett Kischer	6	1936
	Tony Washington	6	1970
	John Schweizer	6	1971
7	Jeremiah Cooper	5	2023

Single game
Rank	Player	Ints	Year	Opponent
1	Everett Kischer	4	1937	Northwestern
	Barry Hill	4	1974	Kansas

=== Tackles ===
Career
Rank	Player	Tackles	Years
1	Chris Washington	457	1980 1981 1982 1983
2	Keith Schroeder	398	1969 1970 1971
3	Ted Jornov	395	1971 1972 1973
4	AJ Klein	361	2009 2010 2011 2012
5	Brad Storm	354	1972 1973 1974
6	Larry Hunt	352	1971 1972 1973
7	Jake Knott	347	2009 2010 2011 2012
8	Shamus McDonough	335	1979 1980 1981 1982
9	Mark DouBrava	334	1989 1990 1991 1992
10	James Reed	333	1997 1998 1999 2000

Single season
Rank	Player	Tackles	Year
1	Chris Washington	168	1981
2	Keith Schroeder	167	1971
3	Malcolm Goodwin	162	1992
4	Keith Schroeder	161	1970
5	Brad Storm	159	1974
6	Alvin Bowen	155	2006
7	Ted Jornov	151	1972
8	Ted Jornov	148	1973
9	Chris Washington	147	1982
10	Chris Moore	145	1986

Single game
Rank	Player	Tackles	Year	Opponent
1	Brian Refner	28	1985	Nebraska

=== Sacks ===
Career
Rank	Player	Sacks	Years
1	Will McDonald IV	34	2018 2019 2020 2021 2022
2	JaQuan Bailey	25.5	2016 2017 2018 2019 2020
3	Shawn Morehead	18.5	2004 2005 2006
4	Brent Curvey	17.0	2003 2004 2005 2006
5	Reggie Hayward	16.5	1998 1999 2000 2001
6	Nick Leaders	15.0	2000 2001 2002
	Eyioma Uwazurike	15.0	2017 2018 2019 2020 2021
8	Lester Williams	14.0	1982 1983 1984 1985
	James Reed	14.0	1997 1998 1999 2000
10	O'Rien Vance	13.5	2018 2019 2020 2021 2022

Single season
Rank	Player	Sacks	Year
1	Will McDonald IV	11.5	2021
2	Will McDonald IV	10.5	2020
3	Eyioma Uwazurike	9.0	2021
4	Shawn Morehead	8.5	2006
5	Dale Pierson	8.0	2015
	JaQuan Bailey	8.0	2018
7	Jason Berryman	7.5	2005
8	Lester Williams	7.0	1983
	Dan Watkins	7.0	1992
	Derrik Clark	7.0	1996
	Reggie Hayward	7.0	2000
	Brent Curvey	7.0	2006
	JaQuan Bailey	7.0	2017
	JaQuan Bailey	7.0	2020

Single game
Rank	Player	Sacks	Year	Opponent
1	Jason Berryman	5.0	2005	TCU
	JaQuan Bailey	5.0	2018	Akron

== Kicking ==
=== Field goals made ===
Career
Rank	Player	FGs	Years
1	Jeff Shudak	58	1987 1988 1989 1990
2	Cole Netten	54	2013 2014 2015 2016
3	**Kyle Konrardy**	50	2024 2025 2026
4	Connor Assalley	48	2018 2019 2020 2021
5	Ty Stewart	44	1991 1992 1993 1994
6	Alex Giffords	43	1979 1980 1981 1982
7	Tom Goedjen	39	1972 1973 1974
	Grant Mahoney	39	2008 2009 2010 2011
8	Bret Culbertson	38	2004 2005 2006 2007
9	Jamie Kohl	37	1995 1996 1997 1998
10	Adam Benike	23	2002 2003

Single season
Rank	Player	FGs	Year
1	Chase Contreraz	21	2023
	**Kyle Konrardy**	21	2024
3	Andrew Mevis	20	2021
	Jeff Shudak	20	1987
5	Jeff Shudak	19	1990
6	Adam Benike	17	2002
	Grant Mahoney	17	2008
	Garrett Owens	17	2017
9	Cole Netten	16	2016
	Connor Assalley	16	2018

Single game
Rank	Player	FGs	Year	Opponent
1	Jeff Shudak	5	1990	Missouri
	Bret Culbertson	5	2007	Iowa

=== Field goal percentage ===
Career
Rank	Player	FG%	Years
1	Andrew Mevis	87.0%	2021
2	Chase Contreraz	80.8%	2023
3	Cole Netten	79.4%	2013 2014 2015 2016
4	**Kyle Konrardy**	75.7%	2024 2025 2026
5	Adam Benike	74.2%	2002 2003
6	Connor Assalley	73.8%	2018 2019 2020 2021
7	Jeff Shudak	73.4%	1987 1988 1989 1990
8	Bret Culbertson	69.1%	2004 2005 2006 2007
9	Rick Frank	66.7%	1985 1986
10	Ty Stewart	64.7%	1991 1992 1993 1994

Single season
Rank	Player	FG%	Year
1	Cole Netten	94.1%	2016
2	Andrew Mevis	87.0%	2021
3	Chase Contreraz	80.8%	2023
4	Jeff Shudak	80.0%	1987
	Bret Culbertson	80.0%	2004
6	Connor Assalley	78.9%	2019
7	Cole Netten	78.6%	2014
8	**Kyle Konrardy**	77.8%	2025
9	Garrett Owens	77.3%	2017
10	Alex Giffords	75.0%	1982
	Bret Culbertson	75.0%	2005
	**Kyle Konrardy**	75.0%	2024

== See also ==
- History of Iowa State Cyclones football
- List of Iowa State Cyclones football seasons
- List of Iowa State Cyclones football All-Americans
- List of Iowa State Cyclones in the NFL draft
