= List of Iowa State Cyclones head football coaches =

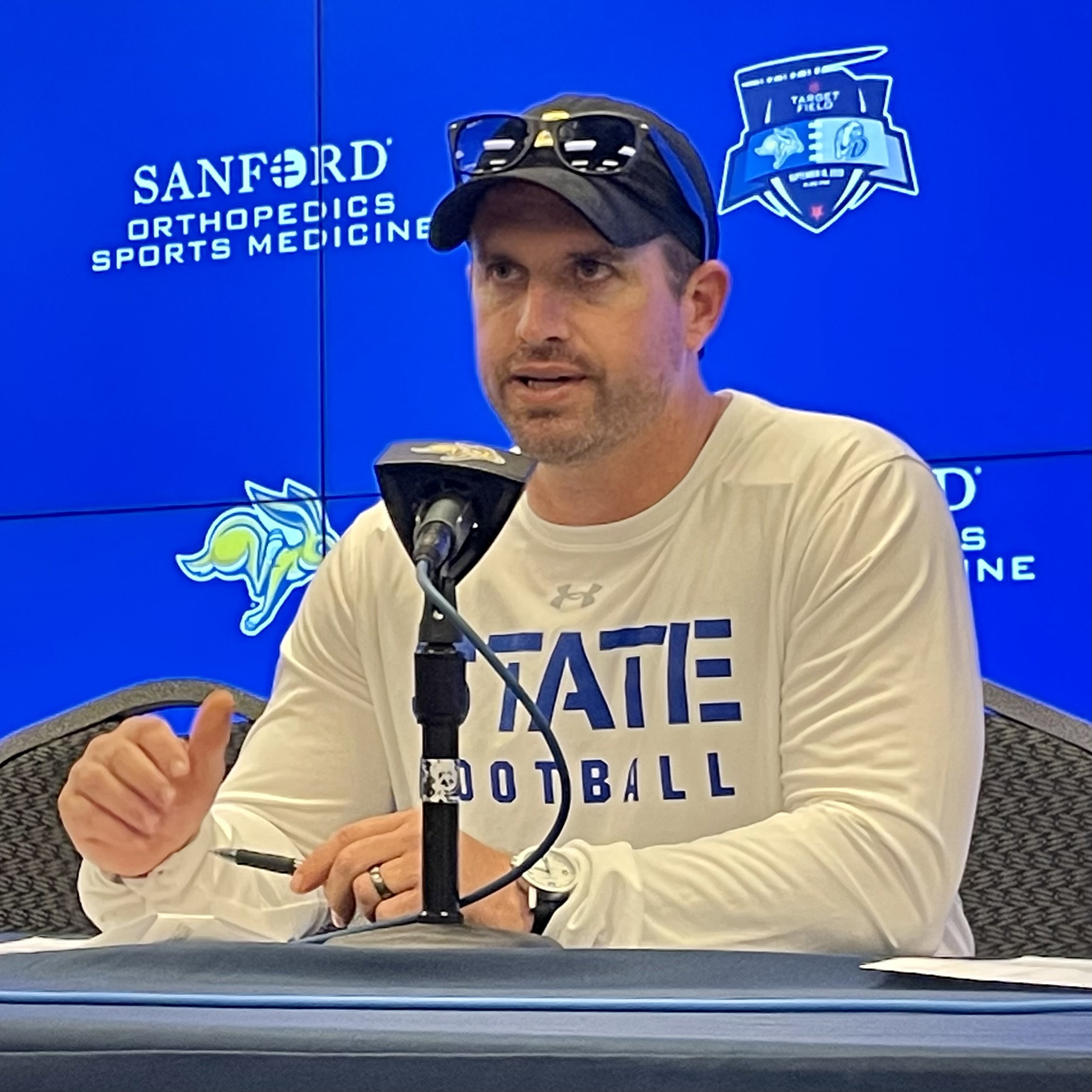
Current head coach Jimmy Rogers

The Iowa State Cyclones football program is a college football team that represents Iowa State University in the Big 12 Conference in the National Collegiate Athletic Association. The team has had 33 head coaches since organized football at the school began in 1892, and was officially sanctioned in 1894. Originally, the Iowa Agricultural College teams were known as the Cardinals. The name was changed after September 29, 1895, when under coach Pop Warner, the Cardinals defeated the Northwestern Wildcats, 36–0. Inspired by an extremely active tornado (then known as a "cyclone") season, the next day, the Chicago Tribune headline read: "Struck by a Cyclone." The article went on to say, "Northwestern might as well have tried to play football with an Iowa cyclone as with the Iowa team it met yesterday." Since then the Iowa State teams have been known as the Cyclones.

Iowa State has played in 1,290 games during its 131 seasons. In those seasons, five coaches have led the Cyclones to postseason bowl games: Johnny Majors, Earle Bruce, Dan McCarney, Paul Rhoads and Matt Campbell. Clyde Williams won two conference championships with the Cyclones. Campbell is the all-time leader in wins as of September 28, 2024 when he surpassed McCarney's record of 56. McCarney is the all-time leader in games coached (141), and years coached (11). Bert German is the all-time leader in winning percentage (.833). W. P. Finney has the lowest winning percentage (.000) having no wins.

Both Warner and Bruce have been inducted into the College Football Hall of Fame. Majors, Bruce, McCarney and Campbell have each received the Coach of the Year Award from their respective conference. The current coach is Matt Campbell, who was hired November 29, 2015. Matt Campbell has received the Big 12 Conference Coach of the Year Award for 2017, 2018 and 2020. For the 2020 season, Matt Campbell led Iowa State to an 8-1 conference leading, regular season record and its first berth in the conference championship game.

== Key ==
Key to symbols in coaches list
General		Overall		Conference		Postseason (Note: Although the first Rose Bowl Game was played in 1902, it has been continuously played since the 1916 game, and is recognized as the oldest bowl game by the NCAA. "—" indicates any season prior to 1916 when postseason games were not played.)	
No.	Order of coaches (Note: A running total of the number of head coaches, with coaches who served separate tenures being counted only once. Interim head coaches are represented with "Int" and are not counted in the running total. "—" indicates the team played but either without a coach or no coach is on record. "X" indicates an interim year without play.)	GC	Games coached	CW	Conference wins	PW	Postseason wins
DC	Division championships	OW	Overall wins	CL	Conference losses	PL	Postseason losses
CC	Conference championships	OL	Overall losses	CT	Conference ties	PT	Postseason ties
NC	National championships	OT	Overall ties (Note: Overtime rules in college football were introduced in 1996, making ties impossible in the period since.)	C%	Conference winning percentage		
†	Elected to the College Football Hall of Fame	O%	Overall winning percentage (Note: When computing the win–loss percentage, a tie counts as half a win and half a loss.)				

== Coaches ==
#	Name	Term	GC	Ws	Ls	Ts	W%	CWs	CLs	CTs	CW%	PWs	PLs	PTs	CCs	Awards
1	Ira C. Brownlie	1892	2	1	0	1	.750	—	—	—	—	—	—	—	—	—
2	W. P. Finney	1893	3	0	3	0	.000	—	—	—	—	—	—	—	—	—
3	Bert German	1894	6	5	1	0	.833	—	—	—	—	—	—	—	—	—
4	Pop Warner^{†}	1895–1899	26	18	8	0	.692	—	—	—	—	—	—	—	—	—
5	Joe Meyers	1899	9	4	4	1	.500	—	—	—	—	—	—	—	—	—
6	C. E. Woodruff	1900	8	2	5	1	.313	—	—	—	—	—	—	—	—	—
7	Edgar M. Clinton	1901	10	2	6	2	.300	—	—	—	—	—	—	—	—	—
8	A. W. Ristine	1902–1906	47	36	10	1	.777	—	—	—	—	—	—	—	—	—
9	Clyde Williams	1907–1912	49	33	14	2	.694	8	5	2	.600	—	—	—	2	—
10	Homer C. Hubbard	1913–1914	15	8	7	0	.533	4	3	1	.563	—	—	—	—	—
11	Charles Mayser	1915–1919	34	21	11	2	.647	10	4	2	.688	—	—	—	—	—
12	Norman C. Paine	1920	8	4	4	0	.500	3	2	0	.600	—	—	—	—	—
13	Maury Kent	1921	8	4	4	0	.500	3	4	0	.429	—	—	—	—	—
14	Sam Willaman	1922–1925	32	14	15	3	.484	11	10	2	.522	—	—	—	—	—
15	C. Noel Workman	1926–1930	41	11	27	3	.305	8	17	2	.333	—	—	—	—	—
16	George F. Veenker	1931–1936	51	21	22	8	.490	7	18	4	.310	—	—	—	—	—
17	James J. Yeager	1937–1940	36	16	19	1	.458	7	12	1	.375	—	—	—	—	—
18	Ray Donels	1941–1942	12	3	8	1	.292	1	4	1	.250	—	—	—	—	—
19	Mike Michalske	1942–1946	39	18	18	3	.500	8	9	2	.474	—	—	—	—	—
20	Abe Stuber	1947–1953	65	24	38	3	.392	12	28	1	.305	—	—	—	—	—
21	Vince DiFrancesca	1954–1956	28	6	21	1	.232	2	15	1	.139	—	—	—	—	—
22	Jim Myers	1957	10	4	5	1	.450	2	4	0	.333	—	—	—	—	—
23	Clay Stapleton	1958–1967	99	42	53	4	.444	22	43	2	.343	—	—	—	—	—
24	Johnny Majors	1968–1972	55	24	30	1	.445	9	25	1	.271	0	2	0	—	Big Eight Coach of the Year (1971)
25	Earle Bruce^{†}	1973–1978	68	36	32	0	.529	18	24	0	.429	0	2	0	—	Big Eight Coach of the Year (1976, 1977)
26	Donnie Duncan	1979–1982	44	18	24	2	.432	7	19	2	.286	—	—	—	—	—
27	Jim Criner	1983–1986	42	16	24	2	.405	8	16	2	.346	—	—	—	—	—
28	Chuck Banker	1986	2	1	1	0	.500	1	1	0	.500	—	—	—	—	—
29	Jim Walden	1987–1994	88	28	57	3	.335	16	37	3	.313	—	—	—	—	—
30	Dan McCarney	1995–2006	141	56	85	0	.397	27	68	0	.284	2	3	0	—	Big 12 Coach of the Year (2004)
31	Gene Chizik	2007–2008	24	5	19	—	.208	2	14	—	.125	—	—	—	—	—
32	Paul Rhoads	2009–2015	87	32	55	—	.368	16	45	—	.262	1	2	—	—	—
33	Matt Campbell	2016–2025	127	72	55	—	.567	50	40	—	.556	3	4	—	—	Big 12 Coach of the Year (2017, 2018, 2020)
34	Jimmy Rogers	2026–present	8	4	4	—	.500	—	1	—	.000	—	—	—	—	—

Iowa State football coaching records accurate as of October 1, 2026.

== See also ==
- Iowa State Cyclones football
- History of Iowa State Cyclones football
- List of Iowa State Cyclones football All-Americans
- Iowa State Cyclones football statistical leaders
- List of Iowa State Cyclones in the NFL draft
