= List of Iowa State Cyclones football All-Americans =

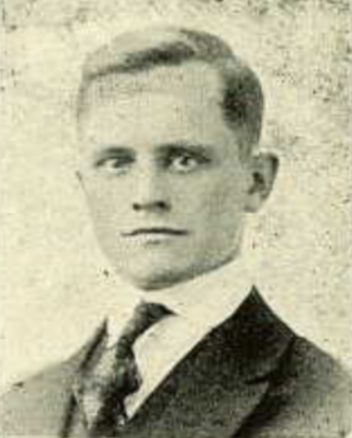
Polly Wallace was named to the 1926 All-America Team

The Iowa State Cyclones college football team competes as part of the National Collegiate Athletic Association (NCAA) Division I Football Bowl Subdivision (FBS), and represents the Iowa State University in the Big 12 Conference (Big 12). All-America selections are individual player recognitions made after each season when numerous publications release lists of their ideal team. The NCAA recognizes five All-America lists: the Associated Press (AP), American Football Coaches Association (AFCA), the Football Writers Association of America (FWAA), Sporting News (TSN), and the Walter Camp Football Foundation (WC). In order for an honoree to earn a "consensus" selection, he must be selected as first team in three of the five lists recognized by the NCAA, and "unanimous" selections must be selected as first team in all five lists.

Since the establishment of the team in 1892, Iowa State has had 16 players honored a total of 24 times as First Team All-America for their performance on the field of play. Included in these selections are 4 consensus selections, 2 of which were unanimous selections. The most significant and recent All-American from Iowa State came after the 2020 season, when Breece Hall was named a unanimous First Team All-America, the first in Iowa State Cyclone history. Hall was also selected along with 2020 teammates Charlie Kolar, Mike Rose, and JaQuan Bailey.

== Key ==
^{†}	Consensus selection
^{‡}	Unanimous selection

=== Selectors ===
AAB	All-America Board	AFCA	American Football Coaches of America	AP	Associated Press	The Atlantic	The Atlantic
CT	Chicago Tribune	CO	Collier's Weekly	SI	Sports Illustrated	CP	Central Press Association
CSW	College Sports Writers	DW	Davis J. Walsh	ES	Ed Sullivan	ESPN	ESPN
FN	The Football News	FWAA	Football Writers Association of America	INS	International News Service	KCS	Kansas City Star
LAT	Los Angeles Times	LIB	Liberty Magazine	LK	Look magazine	NANA	North American Newspaper Alliance
NB	Norman E. Brown	NEA	Newspaper Editors Association	NL	Navy Log	NYEP	New York Evening Post
NYS	New York Sun	OF	Oscar Fraley	PD	Parke H. Davis	SH	Scripps-Howard
Time	Time Magazine	TSN	The Sporting News	UP	United Press	UPI	United Press International
USAT	USA Today	WC	Walter Camp	WD	Walter Dobbins		

== Selections ==
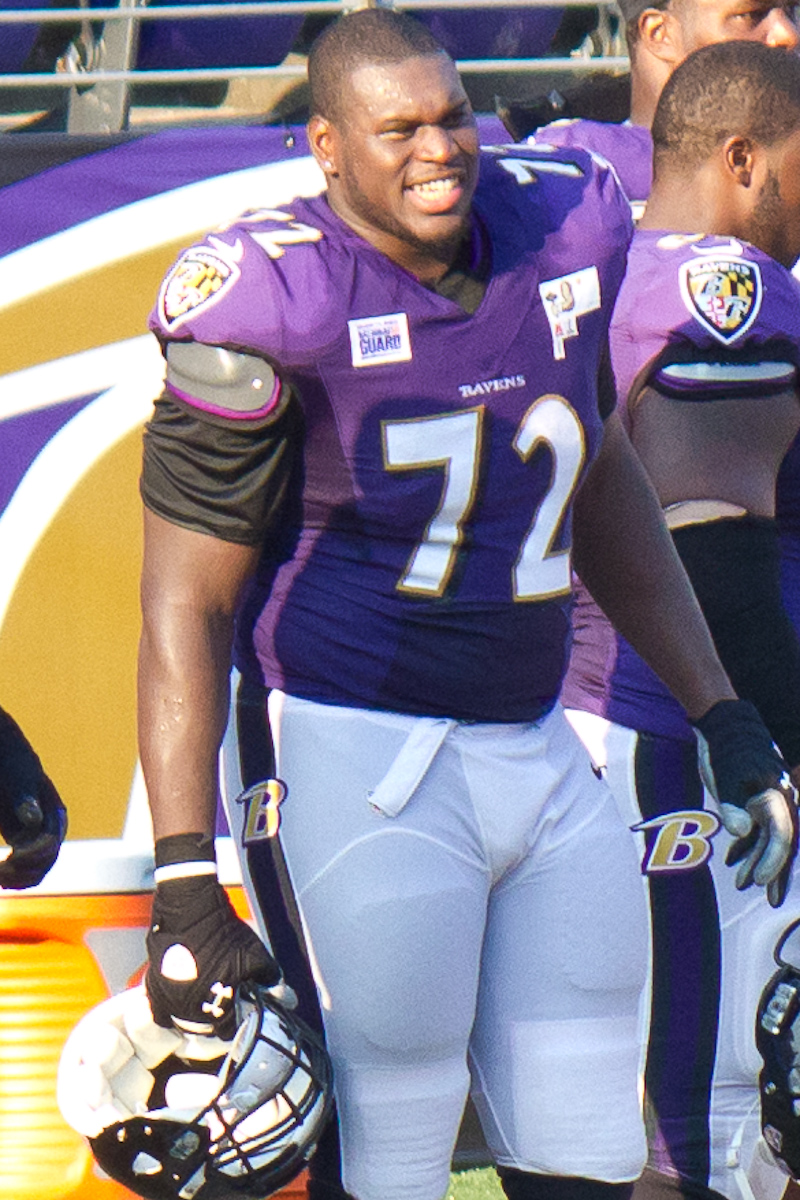
Kelechi Osemele was named to the 2011 All-America Team

List of All-Americans showing the year won, player, position and selectors
Year	Player name	Position	Selector(s)
1919	Dick Barker	G	CT-1
1920	Polly Wallace	C	CT-1; AP-3
1934	Fred Poole	P	AP-1
1935	Ike Hayes	G	NEA-2
1938	Everett Kischer	QB	NEA-3
1938	Ed Bock†	G	AP-1; LIB-1; NEA-1
1944	Jack Fathauer	G	LK-2
1950	Jim Doran	WR	INS-1; AP-2
1959	Dwight Nichols	RB	FWAA-1; NEA-2; AP-3; UPI-3
1960	Tom Watkins	FB	AFCA-2
1961	Dave Hoppmann	RB	AP-3; UPI-3
1962	Dave Hoppmann	RB	FWAA-1; AP-3
1963	Tom Vaughn	FB	FWAA-1; AFCA-2
1964	John Van Sicklen	T	AP-1
1966	Eppie Barney	WR	AP-2
1972	George Amundson	QB	NEA-2
1972	Merv Krakau	DE	AP-3
1972	Geary Murdock	G	FN-1
1973	Matt Blair	LB	AFCA-1
1974	Barry Hill	S	UPI-2; AP-3
1976	Luther Blue	WR	FWAA-1; AP-3
1977	Ron McFarland	NT	FN-2
1978	Mike Stensrud	DT	AP-2
1980	Dwayne Crutchfield	RB	UPI-2
1982	Karl Nelson	T	NEA-1
1983	Tracy Henderson	WR	AP-3
1984	Tracy Henderson	WR	FN-1; AP-2; NEA-2
1989	Mike Busch†	TE	UPI-1; AFCA-1; WC-1
1989	Blaise Bryant	RB	AP-3
1993	Doug Skartvedt	T	AP-3
1995	Troy Davis†	RB	AP-1; AFCA-1; WC-1; TSN-1
1996	Troy Davis†	RB	AP-1; FWAA-1; WC-1; TSN-1
2000	Ben Bruns	C	FN-3
2011	Kelechi Osemele	T	SI-1
2017	Joel Lanning	LB	FWAA-1; SI-2
2019	Charlie Kolar	TE	AP-3; FWAA-2
2020	Breece Hall‡	RB	AP-1; AFCA-1; Athletic-1; CBS-1; ESPN-1; FWAA-1; TSN-1; USAT-1; WC-1;
2020	Mike Rose	LB	AP-2; ESPN-2; USAT-1; Athletic-1; TSN-2
2020	Charlie Kolar	TE	AP-3; ESPN-3; USAT-2; WC-2
2020	JaQuan Bailey	DE	AP-3; ESPN-3; FWAA-1

== See also ==
- Iowa State Cyclones football
- History of Iowa State Cyclones football
- List of Iowa State Cyclones football seasons
- Iowa State Cyclones football statistical leaders
- List of Iowa State Cyclones in the NFL draft
