= List of Iowa State Cyclones football seasons =

This is a list of seasons completed by the Iowa State Cyclones football program since the team's conception in 1892. The list documents season-by-season records, and conference records from 1908 to the present.

== Seasons ==
National champions	Conference champions	Division Title or Championship Game Berth	Bowl game berth

Season	Head coach	Conference	Division	Season results				Bowl result	Final ranking	
Season	Head coach	Conference	Division	Conference finish	Wins	Losses	Ties	Bowl result	AP Poll^{1}	Coaches Poll^{2}
Iowa State Cyclones football seasons
1892	Ira C. Brownlie	Independent	—	—	1	0	1	—	N/A	N/A
1893	W. P. Finney	Independent	—	—	0	3	0	—	N/A	N/A
1894	Bert German	Independent	—	—	5	1	0	—	N/A	N/A
1895	Pop Warner	Independent	—	—	3	3	0	—	N/A	N/A
1896	Pop Warner	Independent	—	—	8	2	0	—	N/A	N/A
1897	Pop Warner	Independent	—	—	3	1	0	—	N/A	N/A
1898	Pop Warner	Independent	—	—	3	2	0	—	N/A	N/A
1899	Joe Meyers	Independent	—	—	5	4	1	—	N/A	N/A
1900	C. E. Woodruff	Independent	—	—	2	5	1	—	N/A	N/A
1901	Edgar M. Clinton	Independent	—	—	2	6	2	—	N/A	N/A
1902	A. W. Ristine	Independent	—	—	6	3	1	—	N/A	N/A
1903	A. W. Ristine	Independent	—	—	8	1	0	—	N/A	N/A
1904	A. W. Ristine	Independent	—	—	7	2	0	—	N/A	N/A
1905	A. W. Ristine	Independent	—	—	6	3	0	—	N/A	N/A
1906	A. W. Ristine	Independent	—	—	9	1	0	—	N/A	N/A
1907	Clyde Williams	Independent	—	—	7	1	0	—	N/A	N/A
1908	Clyde Williams	MVIAA	—	3rd	6	3	0	—	N/A	N/A
1909	Clyde Williams	MVIAA	—	T–5th	4	3	1	—	N/A	N/A
1910	Clyde Williams	MVIAA	—	4th	4	4	0	—	N/A	N/A
1911	Clyde Williams	MVIAA	—	T–1st	6	1	1	—	N/A	N/A
1912	Clyde Williams	MVIAA	—	T–1st	6	2	0	—	N/A	N/A
1913	Homer C. Hubbard	MVIAA	—	4th	4	4	0	—	N/A	N/A
1914	Homer C. Hubbard	MVIAA	—	3rd	4	3	0	—	N/A	N/A
1915	Charles Mayser	MVIAA	—	3rd	6	2	0	—	N/A	N/A
1916	Charles Mayser	MVIAA	—	3rd	5	2	1	—	N/A	N/A
1917	Charles Mayser	MVIAA	—	T–2nd	5	2	0	—	N/A	N/A
1918	Charles Mayser	MVIAA	—	—^{3}	0	3	0	—	N/A	N/A
1919	Charles Mayser	MVIAA	—	2nd	5	2	1	—	N/A	N/A
1920	Norman C. Paine	MVIAA	—	T–3rd	4	4	0	—	N/A	N/A
1921	Maury Kent	MVIAA	—	6th	4	4	0	—	N/A	N/A
1922	Sam Willaman	MVIAA	—	5th	2	6	0	—	N/A	N/A
1923	Sam Willaman	MVIAA	—	4th	4	3	1	—	N/A	N/A
1924	Sam Willaman	MVIAA	—	5th	4	3	1	—	N/A	N/A
1925	Sam Willaman	MVIAA	—	T–3rd	4	3	1	—	N/A	N/A
1926	C. Noel Workman	MVIAA	—	7th	4	3	1	—	N/A	N/A
1927	C. Noel Workman	MVIAA	—	4th	4	3	1	—	N/A	N/A
1928	C. Noel Workman	Big Six^{4}	—	4th	2	5	1	—	N/A	N/A
1929	C. Noel Workman	Big Six^{4}	—	6th	1	7	0	—	N/A	N/A
1930	C. Noel Workman	Big Six^{4}	—	6th	0	9	0	—	N/A	N/A
1931	George F. Veenker	Big Six^{4}	—	2nd	5	3	0	—	N/A	N/A
1932	George F. Veenker	Big Six^{4}	—	6th	3	4	1	—	N/A	N/A
1933	George F. Veenker	Big Six^{4}	—	5th	3	5	1	—	N/A	N/A
1934	George F. Veenker	Big Six^{4}	—	5th	5	3	1	—	N/A	N/A
1935	George F. Veenker	Big Six^{4}	—	5th	2	4	3	—	N/A	N/A
1936	George F. Veenker	Big Six^{4}	—	5th	3	3	2	—	—	N/A
1937	James J. Yeager	Big Six^{4}	—	T–5th	3	6	0	—	—	N/A
1938	James J. Yeager	Big Six^{4}	—	2nd	7	1	1	—	—	N/A
1939	James J. Yeager	Big Six^{4}	—	T–4th	2	7	0	—	—	N/A
1940	James J. Yeager	Big Six^{4}	—	4th	4	5	0	—	—	N/A
1941	Ray Donels	Big Six^{4}	—	6th	2	6	1	—	—	N/A
1942	Ray Donels, Mike Michalske	Big Six^{4}	—	T–5th	3	6	0	—	—	N/A
1943	Mike Michalske	Big Six^{4}	—	T–2nd	4	4	0	—	—	N/A
1944	Mike Michalske	Big Six^{4}	—	2nd	6	1	1	—	—	N/A
1945	Mike Michalske	Big Six^{4}	—	3rd	4	3	1	—	—	N/A
1946	Mike Michalske	Big Six^{4}	—	5th	2	6	1	—	—	N/A
1947	Abe Stuber	Big Six^{4}	—	5th	3	6	0	—	—	N/A
1948	Abe Stuber	Big Seven	—	T–5th	4	6	0	—	—	N/A
1949	Abe Stuber	Big Seven	—	T–3rd	5	3	1	—	—	N/A
1950	Abe Stuber	Big Seven	—	5th	3	6	1	—	—	—
1951	Abe Stuber	Big Seven	—	T–4th	4	4	1	—	—	—
1952	Abe Stuber	Big Seven	—	6th	3	6	0	—	—	—
1953	Abe Stuber	Big Seven	—	7th	2	7	0	—	—	—
1954	Vince DiFrancesca	Big Seven	—	6th	3	6	0	—	—	—
1955	Vince DiFrancesca	Big Seven	—	T–5th	1	7	1	—	—	—
1956	Vince DiFrancesca	Big Seven	—	7th	2	8	0	—	—	—
1957	Jim Myers	Big Seven	—	T–5th	4	5	1	—	—	—
1958	Clay Stapleton	Big Seven	—	7th	4	6	0	—	—	—
1959	Clay Stapleton	Big Seven	—	T–3rd	7	3	0	—	—	—
1960	Clay Stapleton	Big Eight	—	4th	7	3	0	—	—	—
1961	Clay Stapleton	Big Eight	—	5th	5	5	0	—	—	—
1962	Clay Stapleton	Big Eight	—	5th	5	5	0	—	—	—
1963	Clay Stapleton	Big Eight	—	T–5th	4	5	0	—	—	—
1964	Clay Stapleton	Big Eight	—	8th	1	8	1	—	—	—
1965	Clay Stapleton	Big Eight	—	4th	5	4	1	—	—	—
1966	Clay Stapleton	Big Eight	—	6th	2	6	2	—	—	—
1967	Clay Stapleton	Big Eight	—	7th	2	8	0	—	—	—
1968	Johnny Majors	Big Eight	—	8th	3	7	0	—	—	—
1969	Johnny Majors	Big Eight	—	7th	3	7	0	—	—	—
1970	Johnny Majors	Big Eight	—	8th	5	6	0	—	—	—
1971	Johnny Majors	Big Eight	—	4th	8	4	0	Lost Sun Bowl vs. #11 LSU, 15–33	—	17
1972	Johnny Majors	Big Eight	—	6th	5	6	1	Lost Liberty Bowl vs. #20 Georgia Tech, 30–31	—	—
1973	Earle Bruce	Big Eight	—	T–7th	4	7	0	—	—	—
1974	Earle Bruce	Big Eight	—	6th	4	7	0	—	—	—
1975	Earle Bruce	Big Eight	—	7th	4	7	0	—	—	—
1976	Earle Bruce	Big Eight	—	T–4th	8	3	0	—	19	18
1977	Earle Bruce	Big Eight	—	T–2nd	8	4	0	Lost Peach Bowl vs. NC State, 14–24	—	—
1978	Earle Bruce	Big Eight	—	T–3rd	8	4	0	Lost Hall of Fame Classic Bowl vs. #19 Texas A&M, 12–28	—	—
1979	Donnie Duncan	Big Eight	—	T–5th	3	8	0	—	—	—
1980	Donnie Duncan	Big Eight	—	T–4th	6	5	0	—	—	—
1981	Donnie Duncan	Big Eight	—	6th	5	5	1	—	—	—
1982	Donnie Duncan	Big Eight	—	T–6th	4	6	1	—	—	—
1983	Jim Criner	Big Eight	—	T–4th	4	7	0	—	—	—
1984	Jim Criner	Big Eight	—	8th	2	7	2	—	—	—
1985	Jim Criner	Big Eight	—	5th	5	6	0	—	—	—
1986	Jim Criner, Chuck Banker	Big Eight	—	5th	6	5	0	—	—	—
1987	Jim Walden	Big Eight	—	6th	3	8	0	—	—	—
1988	Jim Walden	Big Eight	—	5th	5	6	0	—	—	—
1989	Jim Walden	Big Eight	—	4th	6	5	0	—	—	—
1990	Jim Walden	Big Eight	—	T–4th	4	6	1	—	—	—
1991	Jim Walden	Big Eight	—	6th	3	7	1	—	—	—
1992	Jim Walden	Big Eight	—	T–6th	4	7	0	—	—	—
1993	Jim Walden	Big Eight	—	T–7th	3	8	0	—	—	—
1994	Jim Walden	Big Eight	—	T–7th	0	10	1	—	—	—
1995	Dan McCarney	Big Eight	—	T–7th	3	8	0	—	—	—
1996	Dan McCarney	Big 12	North	6th	2	9	0	—	—	—
1997	Dan McCarney	Big 12	North	6th	1	10	0	—	—	—
1998	Dan McCarney	Big 12	North	T–5th	3	8	0	—	—	—
1999	Dan McCarney	Big 12	North	T–5th	4	7	0	—	—	—
2000	Dan McCarney	Big 12	North	3rd	9	3	0	Won Insight.com Bowl vs. Pittsburgh, 37–29	25	23
2001	Dan McCarney	Big 12	North	3rd	7	5	0	Lost Independence Bowl vs. Alabama, 13–14	—	—
2002	Dan McCarney	Big 12	North	3rd	7	7	0	Lost Humanitarian Bowl vs. #16 Boise State, 16–34	—	—
2003	Dan McCarney	Big 12	North	6th	2	10	0	—	—	—
2004	Dan McCarney	Big 12	North	T–1st^{6}	7	5	0	Won Independence Bowl vs. Miami (OH), 17–13	—	—
2005	Dan McCarney	Big 12	North	T–2nd	7	5	0	Lost Houston Bowl vs. #14 TCU, 24–27	—	—
2006	Dan McCarney	Big 12	North	6th	4	8	0	—	—	—
2007	Gene Chizik	Big 12	North	T–5th	3	9	0	—	—	—
2008	Gene Chizik	Big 12	North	6th	2	10	0	—	—	—
2009	Paul Rhoads	Big 12	North	4th	7	6	0	Won Insight Bowl vs. Minnesota, 14–13	—	—
2010	Paul Rhoads	Big 12	North	T–3rd	5	7	0	—	—	—
2011	Paul Rhoads	Big 12	—	8th	6	7	0	Lost Pinstripe Bowl vs. Rutgers, 13–27	—	—
2012	Paul Rhoads	Big 12	—	9th	6	7	0	Lost Liberty Bowl vs. Tulsa, 17–31	—	—
2013	Paul Rhoads	Big 12	—	T–7th	3	9	0	—	—	—
2014	Paul Rhoads	Big 12	—	10th	2	10	0	—	—	—
2015	Paul Rhoads	Big 12	—	9th	3	9	0	—	—	—
2016	Matt Campbell	Big 12	—	9th	3	9	0	—	—	—
2017	Matt Campbell	Big 12	—	T–4th	8	5	0	Won Liberty Bowl vs. #19 Memphis, 21–20	—	—
2018	Matt Campbell	Big 12	—	T-3rd	8	5	0	Lost Alamo Bowl vs. #12 Washington State, 26–28	—	—
2019	Matt Campbell	Big 12	—	T-3rd	7	6	0	Lost Camping World Bowl vs. #14 Notre Dame, 9–33	—	—
2020	Matt Campbell	Big 12	—	1st	9	3	0	Won Fiesta Bowl vs. #25 Oregon, 34–17	9	9
2021	Matt Campbell	Big 12	—	4th	7	6	0	Lost Cheez-It Bowl vs. #14 Clemson, 13–20	—	—
2022	Matt Campbell	Big 12	—	10th	4	8	0	—	—	—
2023	Matt Campbell	Big 12	—	T–4th	7	6	0	Lost Liberty Bowl vs. Memphis, 26–36	—	—
2024	Matt Campbell	Big 12	—	T–1st	11	3	0	Won Pop-Tarts Bowl vs. #13 Miami, 42–41	15	15
2025	Matt Campbell	Big 12	—	11th	8	4	0	—	—	—
2026	Jimmy Rogers	Big 12	—							
Total					585	685	46	Overall Record		
Total					6	9	0	Bowl Record		

1. The AP Poll was introduced in 1936. Thus, there are no polls for previous seasons.
2. The Coaches Poll was introduced in 1950. Therefore, polls for prior seasons do not exist.
3. The MVIAA did not have any standings or award a champion during the 1918 football season due to World War I and the outbreak of the Spanish Flu.
4. The Big Six, Big Seven, and Big Eight were the same conference. The name was unofficially changed when the membership changed.
5. Overtime rules in were introduced in 1996, making ties impossible.
6. Iowa State tied Colorado for first in the division, but Colorado won the tiebreaker by virtue of its head-to-head win.
