= Ennis Haywood =

American football player (1979–2003)

No. 46
- Position: Running back

Personal information
- Born: December 5, 1979; Dallas, Texas, U.S.
- Died: May 11, 2003 (aged 23); Arlington, Texas, U.S.
- Listed height: 5 ft 10 in (1.78 m)
- Listed weight: 224 lb (102 kg)

Career information
- High school: Dallas Carter (Dallas, Texas)
- College: Iowa State
- NFL draft: 2002: undrafted

Career history
- Dallas Cowboys (2002)*
- * Offseason or practice squad member only

Awards and highlights
- 2× First-team All-Big 12 (2000, 2001)

Ennis Haywood (December 5, 1979 – May 11, 2003) was an American football running back in the National Football League for the Dallas Cowboys. He played college football at Iowa State University.

== Early life ==
Haywood attended Dallas Carter High School. As a senior, he had to overcome an injury to collect 800 rushing yards, 10 touchdowns and 85 tackles on defense. He received third-team All-area honors.

He received honor roll recognition during all of his four years with a 3.50 GPA.

== College career ==
Haywood accepted a football scholarship from Iowa State University. As a true freshman, he was the backup running back behind Darren Davis. He had 30 carries for 178 yards (5.9-yard avg.) and 2 touchdowns.

As a sophomore, he remained the backup running back behind Davis, collecting 55 carries for 278 yards (5.1-yard avg.) and 3 touchdowns. He rushed for 178 yards and one touchdown in the season opener against Indiana State University, after replacing an injured Davis.

As a junior, he was named the starter at running back after Davis graduated, sharing the backfield with future NFL quarterback Sage Rosenfels. He registered 229 carries for 1,237 yards (led the Big 12 Conference), a 5.4-yard average, 8 touchdowns and 25 receptions for 211 yards. He rushed for 241 yards and 2 touchdowns against Baylor University. He contributed to the team having a 9–3 record and posting the school's first bowl win.

As a senior, he shared the backfield with future NFL quarterback Seneca Wallace. He registered 258 carries for 1,169 yards, a 4.5-yard average, 14 rushing touchdowns (tied for sixth in school history) and 20 receptions for 138 yards. He led the Big 12 Conference in rushing and was ranked 10th nationally with a 123.7 rushing yards-per-game average, becoming the seventh Iowa State running back to reach 1,000 yards in at least 2 seasons, while contributing to the school having back to back bowl appearances. He had 189 rushing yards and 4 touchdowns against the University of Kansas.

He finished his college career with 2,862 rushing yards (fifth in school history), 27 rushing touchdowns (sixth in school history), 3,468 all-purpose yards (fourth in school history) and a 5.0 yards per carry average (second in school history). He only lost one fumble and Iowa State had a 12–0 record when Haywood rushed for 100 yards.

== Professional career ==
Haywood was signed as an undrafted free agent by the Dallas Cowboys after the 2002 NFL draft on April 29. He led the team in rushing during the pre-season with 31 carries for 120 yards. He was waived on September 1. He was signed to the practice squad on September 3, where he remained for the rest of the season.

On April 23, 2003, he was re-signed by the Cowboys to compete for a roster spot. In May, he participated in the team's three-day minicamp.

== Death ==
Haywood was rushed to the hospital on May 10, 2003, after he began vomiting in his sleep and ceased breathing. On May 11, he was taken off life support at his family's request. It was later found that a mixture of prescription medications for Haywood's asthma and alcohol played a part in his death.

== Personal life ==
Haywood was married with two children.
