= Andrew Mevis =

American football player (born 1998)

No. 16 – Green Bay Blizzard
- Position: Placekicker
- Roster status: Active

Personal information
- Born: October 12, 1998 (age 28); Warsaw, Indiana, U.S.
- Listed height: 5 ft 11 in (1.80 m)
- Listed weight: 205 lb (93 kg)

Career information
- High school: Warsaw (IN)
- College: Fordham (2017–2020); Iowa State (2021)
- NFL draft: 2022: undrafted

Career history
- Jacksonville Jaguars (2022)*; St. Louis Battlehawks (2024)*; Green Bay Blizzard (2024–present)
- * Offseason or practice squad member only

Awards and highlights
- 2× First-team All-IFL (2025, 2026); Third-team All-American (2021)

Andrew Mevis (born October 12, 1998) is an American professional football placekicker for the Green Bay Blizzard of the Indoor Football League (IFL). He played college football for the Fordham Rams and Iowa State Cyclones.

== Professional career ==
Pre-draft measurables
Height	Weight	Arm length	Hand span
5 ft 10 1/2 in (1.79 m)	207 lb (94 kg)	30 3/8 in (0.77 m)	8 1/2 in (0.22 m)
All values from Pro Day

=== Jacksonville Jaguars ===
After going unselected in the 2022 NFL draft, Mevis was signed by the Jacksonville Jaguars as an undrafted free agent. Mevis was cut by the Jaguars on July 29, 2022, as Jacksonville tried out 4 kickers following Mevis going 1–4 on field goals during a practice session the day before on July 28. Jacksonville signed kicker Elliott Fry as Mevis's replacement.

=== St. Louis Battlehawks ===
On January 26, 2024, Mevis signed with the St. Louis Battlehawks of the United Football League (UFL). He was released on March 10.

=== Green Bay Blizzard ===
On April 18, 2024, Mevis signed with the Green Bay Blizzard of the Indoor Football League (IFL).

== Personal life ==
Mevis is the older brother of former Los Angeles Rams kicker Harrison Mevis.
