= Todd Blythe =

American gridiron football player and coach (born 1985)

Profile
- Position: Wide receiver

Personal information
- Born: March 31, 1985 (age 41); Ames, Iowa
- Listed height: 6 ft 5 in (1.96 m)
- Listed weight: 214 lb (97 kg)

Career information
- High school: Indianola High School (Iowa)
- College: Iowa State
- NFL draft: 2008: undrafted

Career history

Playing
- New Orleans Saints (2008)*; Saskatchewan Roughriders (2009)*; Iowa Barnstormers (2010–2012)
- * Offseason or practice squad member only

Coaching
- Simpson (2010–2011) Wide receivers coach; Northern Iowa (2012–present) Wide receivers coach

Awards and highlights
- First-team All-Big 12 (2005); Second-team All-Big 12 (2004)

Todd Blythe (born March 31, 1985) is a former gridiron football player who played in the Arena Football League (AFL). He was signed by the New Orleans Saints as an undrafted free agent in 2008. He played college football at Iowa State University. He is currently serving as an offensive assistant for the Northern Iowa Panthers.

== College ==
Blythe is one of the most prolific receivers in Iowa State Cyclone history. He started all 45 games he played in for Iowa State and holds the school career records in receiving yards with 3,096 and receiving touchdowns with 31. The only player with more receptions than his 171 is former Iowa State wide receiver Allen Lazard.

Blythe earned his degree in liberal arts in 2008.

== 2008 ==
After his senior year of college, Blythe went undrafted in the 2008 NFL Draft. He then spent some of the year with the New Orleans Saints.

== 2009 ==
Blythe was signed by the Saskatchewan Roughriders of the Canadian Football league but was released 5 months later.

== 2010 ==
In 2010, Blythe returned to his home state of Iowa, and was signed by the Iowa Barnstormers of the Arena Football League. That year, he caught 66 passes for 826 yards and 22 touchdowns.

== 2011 ==
Blythe played a second season in Iowa and caught 87 passes for 1181 yards and 27 touchdowns.

== 2012 ==
Todd Blythe remained a free agent throughout the 2012 playing season.

In 2012, Blythe accepted the position of wide receivers coach for the Northern Iowa Panthers football team. Prior to joining UNI, he spent two seasons with Simpson College in his hometown of Indianola, Iowa. He served as a wide receivers coach for the Simpson Storm.

== 2015 ==
In 2015, Todd married long-time girlfriend Brittany (Benson) Blythe. She is a Nurse Practitioner in the Des Moines area. Todd is said to be working in medical sales.

== Career receiving statistics ==
Year	Team	Games	Rec	Yards	Y/R	TDs
2010	Iowa Barnstormers	16	66	826	12.5	22
2011	Iowa Barnstormers	18	87	1,181	13.6	27
