= Allen Lazard =

American football player (born 1995)

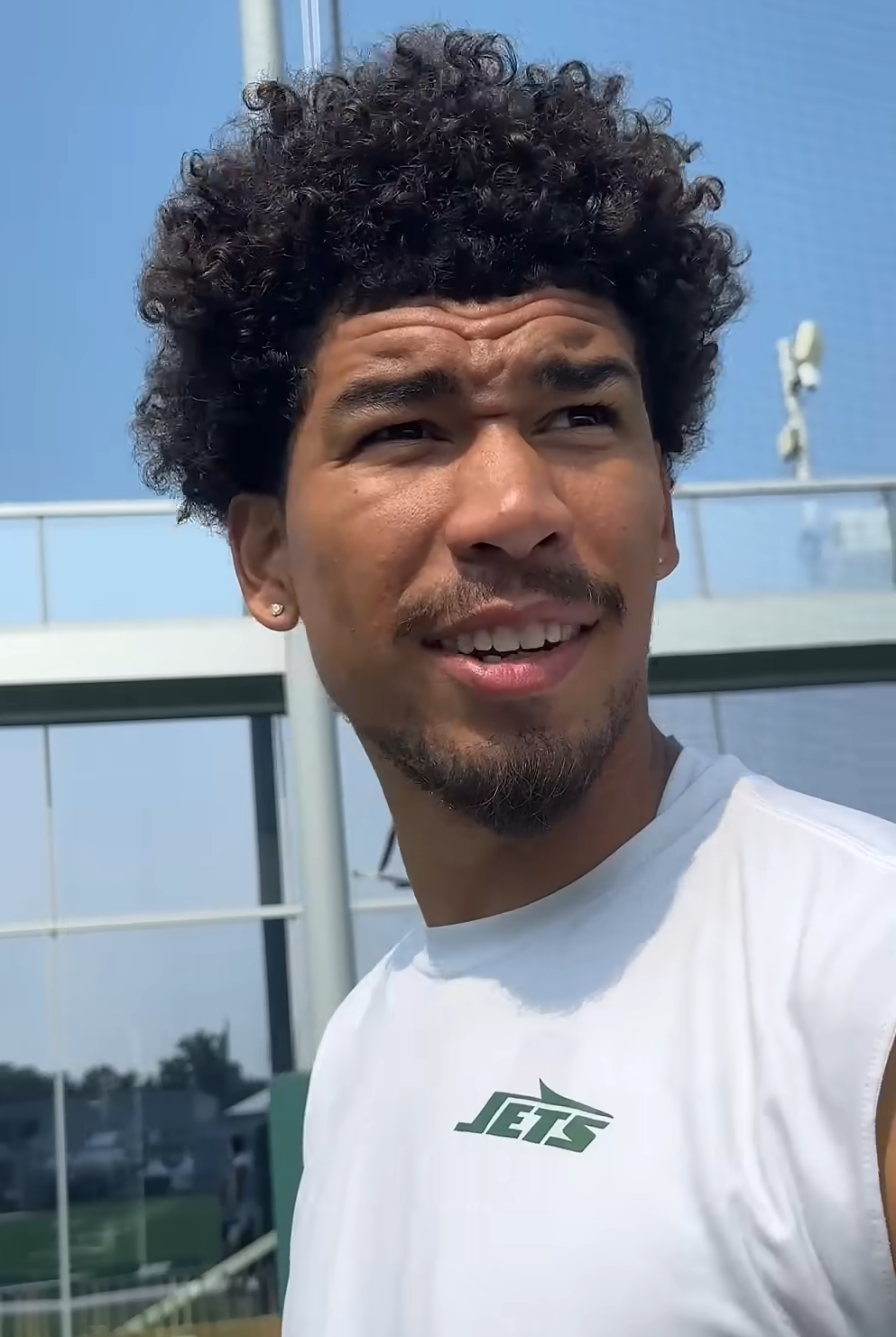
- Lazard with the New York Jets in 2025

Profile
- Position: Wide receiver

Personal information
- Born: December 11, 1995 (age 30); Des Moines, Iowa, U.S.
- Listed height: 6 ft 5 in (1.96 m)
- Listed weight: 240 lb (109 kg)

Career information
- High school: Urbandale (Urbandale, Iowa)
- College: Iowa State (2014–2017)
- NFL draft: 2018: undrafted

Career history
- Jacksonville Jaguars (2018)*; Green Bay Packers (2018–2022); New York Jets (2023–2025)
- * Offseason or practice squad member only

Awards and highlights
- 2× First-team All-Big 12 (2016, 2017); Second-team All-Big 12 (2015)

Career NFL statistics as of 2025
- Receptions: 239
- Receiving yards: 3,147
- Receiving touchdowns: 28
- Stats at Pro Football Reference

Allen Jamel Lazard (born December 11, 1995) is an American professional football wide receiver. He played college football for the Iowa State Cyclones and was signed by the Jacksonville Jaguars as an undrafted free agent in 2018. He has previously played in the National Football League (NFL) for the Green Bay Packers and New York Jets.

Lazard was a highly-rated recruit coming out of high school, where he was named a USA Today High School All-American. Lazard has been selected to the first-team All-Big 12 in both 2016 and 2017 and is Iowa State's career leader in both receptions and receiving yards.

== Early life ==
At Urbandale High School, Lazard played high school football and was a four-year starter on both offense and defense. Lazard still holds the school career records in receptions (105), receiving yards (2,349), touchdowns (34) and interceptions (14). His high school honors include but are not limited to: USA Today All American, Des Moines Register's Offensive Player of the Year in 2013, Defensive Player of the Year in 2012, and a three-time All-State selection.

A consensus four-star wide receiver, Lazard was a highly touted recruit out of high school. He was ranked the No. 1 recruit of the state of Iowa and the 7th best receiver in the country by Rivals. Lazard ultimately followed his father Kevin (1990–93) and brother Anthony (2013–16) in playing for the Iowa State Cyclones over Notre Dame, Nebraska, Stanford, California and Iowa.

Prior to enrolling at Iowa State, Lazard played in the 2014 U.S. Army All-American Bowl.

College recruiting
| Name | Hometown | School | Height | Weight | Commit date |
|---|---|---|---|---|---|
| Allen Lazard; WR | Urbandale, Iowa | Urbandale High School | 6 ft 4 in (1.93 m) | 207 lb (94 kg) | Apr 26, 2014 |
| Allen Lazard; WR | Recruit ratings: Scout: Rivals: 247Sports: (83) | | | | |
Overall recruit ranking: Rivals: 47, 1 (IA), 7 (WR) 247Sports: 78, 2 (IA), 10 (WR) ESPN: 148, 2 (IA), 18 (WR)
Note: In many cases, Scout, Rivals, 247Sports, On3, and ESPN may conflict in their listings of height and weight.; In these cases, the average was taken. ESPN grades are on a 100-point scale.; Sources: "2014 Iowa State Football Commitment List". Rivals.; "2014 Iowa State Football Commits". Scout.; "ESPN". ESPN.; "Scout.com Team Recruiting Rankings". Scout.; "2014 Team Ranking". Rivals.com.

== College career ==
=== 2014 season ===
Opting not to redshirt, Lazard started 11 of the Cyclones 12 games. He finished second on the team in receptions (45) and receiving yards (593) as well as scoring three touchdowns. Both reception and receiving totals rank second all-time for an ISU freshman. The first catch of his career went for 48 yards against North Dakota State and he caught his first career touchdown pass against Kansas State the next week. His season high was 96 yards and a touchdown against the Toledo Rockets.

At the conclusion of the season, Lazard was named to the All-Big 12 honorable mention team and earned ESPN.com Big 12 All-Underclassman honors.

=== 2015 season ===
Lazard built on the success from his freshman season by starting all 11 games he played in and led the team in receptions (56), receiving yards (808) and touchdown catches (6). He ranked fifth in the Big 12 and 59th nationally in receptions per game (5.1) and was sixth in the Big 12 and 51st in the nation in receiving yardage (73.5). His seasons highs included a then career-high 147 yards receiving and a career-long 74-yard touchdown against TCU and a pair of touchdowns on five catches for 87 yards against Kansas State.

Lazard was named Second-team All-Big 12 by the AP and ESPN's Big 12 All-Underclassman team for second-straight season as well receiving the Pete Taylor Most Valuable Player.

=== 2016 season ===
Lazard's breakout season was in 2016 and was one of the greatest single seasons in Cyclone history. He once again led the team in receptions (69), receiving yards (1,018) and TD catches (7) as well as breaking the school record for 100-yard receiving games with six and becoming the fourth player in school history to record a 1,000-yard season. He ranked sixth in the Big 12 and 37th nationally in receptions per game (5.8) and ranked fifth in the Big 12 and 29th nationally in receiving yards per game (84.8). Lazard opened the season with back-to-back 100-yard games against in-state rivals UNI (129) and Iowa (111). Against Kansas State, he tallied eight receptions for 134 yards. He recorded a career-high 10 receptions for 120 yards and a touchdown against Kansas. Lazard finished the season with three straight 100-yard games against Kansas (120), Texas Tech (137) and West Virginia (103).

Lazard was named First-team All-Big 12 by the Coaches and ESPN and as the Pete Taylor Most Valuable Player for the second straight year.

=== 2017 season ===
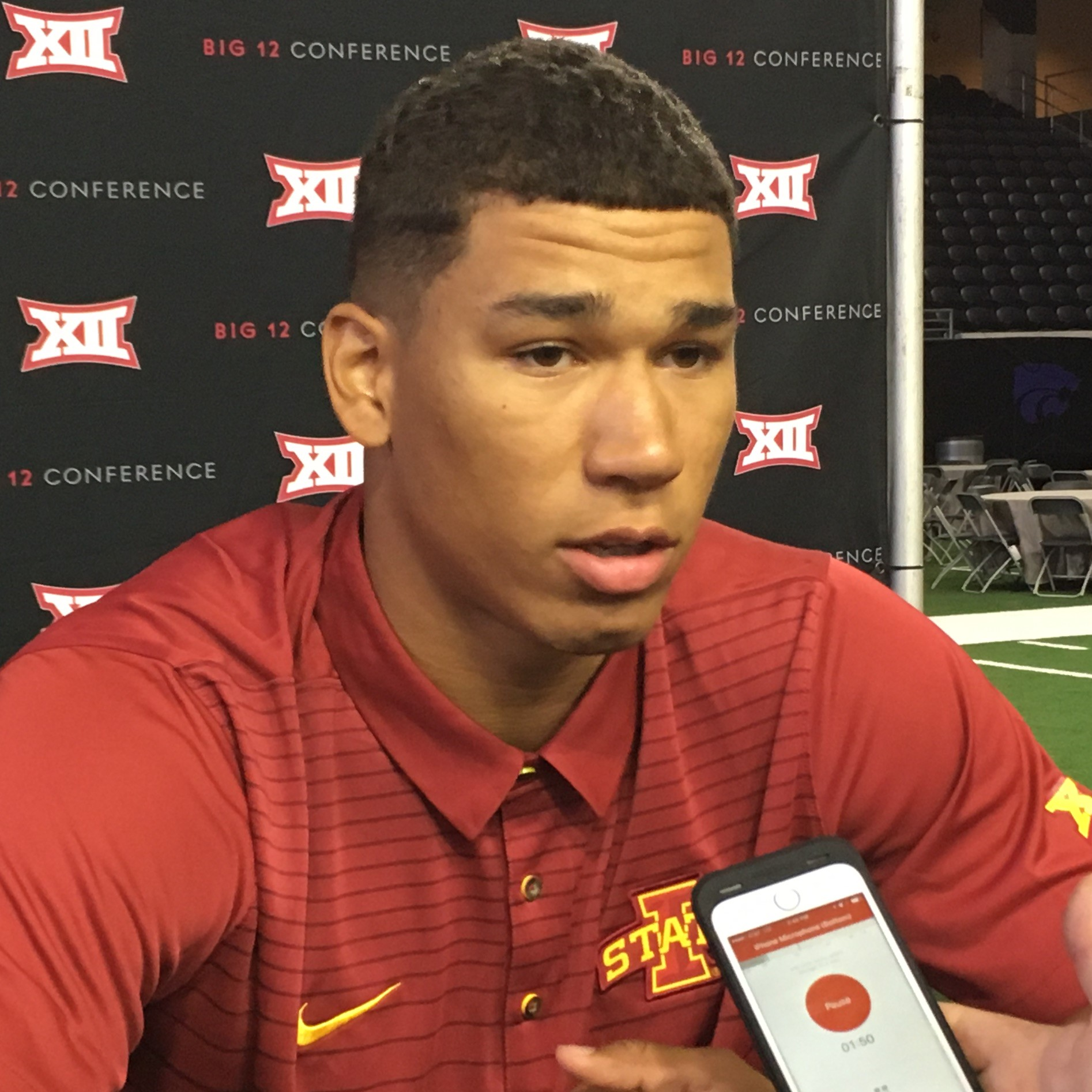
Lazard in college at Iowa State in 2017

In 2017, Lazard continued on his success of 2016. He again led the team in receptions, receiving yards, and touchdowns with 71, 941, and 10 respectively. Against Northern Iowa, Lazard had eight receptions for 108 yards, he followed that up with two touchdown catches against Iowa the next week. In the win at No. 3 Oklahoma, Allen had 69 yards and a game-sealing touchdown. In the home victory against TCU, Lazard had another 100-yard performance with 106 yards on six catches. His two best games of the season were nine receptions for 126 yards and a touchdown against Oklahoma State and 10 catches for 142 yards and a touchdown in the Liberty Bowl win against No. 19 Memphis.

At the conclusion of the season, Lazard was named First-Team All-Big 12 by the coaches and Second-team All-Big 12 by the media.

=== College statistics ===
| Season | Team | GP | Receiving | | | |
| Season | Team | GP | Rec | Yds | Avg | TD |
|---|---|---|---|---|---|---|
| 2014 | Iowa State | 12 | 45 | 593 | 13.2 | 3 |
| 2015 | Iowa State | 11 | 56 | 808 | 14.4 | 6 |
| 2016 | Iowa State | 12 | 69 | 1,018 | 14.8 | 7 |
| 2017 | Iowa State | 13 | 71 | 941 | 13.3 | 10 |
| Total | | 48 | 241 | 3,360 | 13.9 | 26 |

=== College records ===
Iowa State

- Career receptions, 241
- Career receiving yards, 3,360
- Single season touchdowns, 10 (2017)
- Consecutive games with a reception, 48
- Consecutive 100-yard receiving games, 4
- 100-yard receiving games, 12

== Professional career ==
=== Pre-draft ===
Lazard received an invitation to take part in the 2018 Senior Bowl.

Pre-draft measurables
| Height | Weight | Arm length | Hand span | 40-yard dash | 10-yard split | 20-yard split | 20-yard shuttle | Three-cone drill | Vertical jump | Broad jump | Bench press |
|---|---|---|---|---|---|---|---|---|---|---|---|
| 6 ft 4 5/8 in (1.95 m) | 227 lb (103 kg) | 32 1/4 in (0.82 m) | 9 3/4 in (0.25 m) | 4.55 s | 1.58 s | 2.63 s | 4.33 s | 7.11 s | 38.0 in (0.97 m) | 10 ft 4 in (3.15 m) | 17 reps |
All values from NFL Combine/Pro Day

=== Jacksonville Jaguars ===
Lazard signed with the Jacksonville Jaguars as an undrafted free agent on April 30, 2018. He was waived on September 1, 2018, and was signed to the practice squad the next day.

=== Green Bay Packers ===
==== 2018 season ====
On December 18, 2018, Lazard was signed by the Green Bay Packers off the Jaguars' practice squad.

==== 2019 season ====
Lazard was waived on August 31, 2019, and was signed to the practice squad the next day. He was promoted to the active roster on September 4, 2019. Lazard recorded his first professional touchdown, a 35-yard reception from Aaron Rodgers, during a Week 6 win over the Detroit Lions on October 14, 2019. He had a breakout performance on December 1, 2019, in a 31–13 Week 13 victory over the New York Giants, posting three catches for 103 yards and a touchdown. Overall, Lazard finished the 2019 season with 35 receptions for 477 receiving yards and three receiving touchdowns, while also adding one rushing attempt for 21 yards.

==== 2020 season ====
On March 17, 2020, the Packers tendered Lazard as an exclusive-rights free agent. He signed the one-year tender on April 27, 2020. In the season-opener against the Minnesota Vikings, Lazard caught four passes for 63 yards and his first touchdown of the season during the 43–34 road victory. During Sunday Night Football against the New Orleans Saints in Week 3, Lazard finished with six receptions for 146 yards and a touchdown in the 37–30 road victory. He was placed on injured reserve on October 3, 2020, after undergoing core muscle surgery. Lazard was activated on November 17, 2020. In Week 12, in his second game off of injured reserve, Lazard caught his third touchdown of the season in a 41–25 victory over the Chicago Bears, along with 23 receiving yards. Lazard finished the season with 33 receptions for 451 yards and three touchdowns, nearly matching his previous year total despite playing in six fewer games.

In the Divisional Round of the playoffs against the Los Angeles Rams, Lazard recorded four catches for 96 yards, including a 58-yard touchdown, during the 32–18 win. In the NFC Championship against the Tampa Bay Buccaneers, Lazard recorded three catches for 62 yards during the 31–26 loss.

==== 2021 season ====
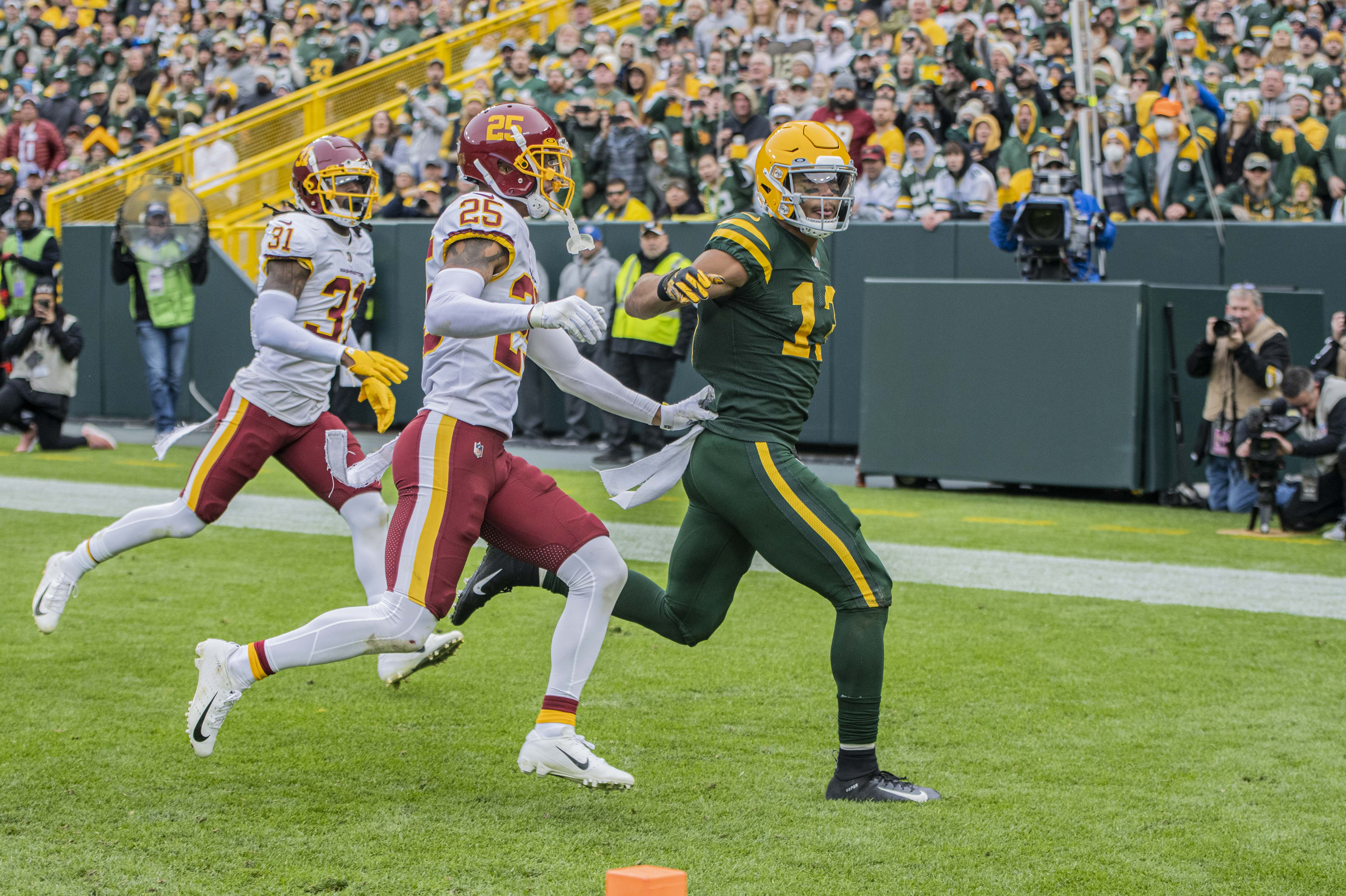
Lazard (right) in 2021

On July 28, 2021, Lazard signed his exclusive rights tender, keeping him in Green Bay for the 2021 season. Lazard's season started off slowly, having 15 catches for 184 yards through the first eight games of the season. On October 26, ahead of the Packers' Week 9 game against the Arizona Cardinals, fellow wide receiver Davante Adams tested positive for COVID-19. Lazard, who was unvaccinated, was placed on the COVID-19/Reserve list due to being a close contact. He was activated off the COVID-19/Reserve list on November 1, 2021. Lazard was fined $14,650 for violating NFL COVID-19 protocols along with quarterback Aaron Rodgers.

Lazard was the recipient of backup quarterback Jordan Love's first NFL touchdown in a Week 9 13–7 road loss to the Kansas City Chiefs Lazard picked up the pace through the second half of the season. In Week 14, Lazard had six receptions for 75 yards and a touchdown in a 45–30 win over the Bears. In Week 16, in a Christmas Day showdown with the Cleveland Browns, Lazard caught Rodgers' 443rd career touchdown pass with the Packers, breaking the previous record of 442, held by Brett Favre. The following week, he caught all six of his targets for 72 yards and a touchdown as the Packers won 37–10 against the Vikings to clinch home-field advantage throughout the playoffs. In the regular-season finale, Lazard played just one half as the Packers rested their starters in the second half against the Detroit Lions; despite that, Lazard matched a season-high 75 receiving yards and notched a career-high two touchdowns in a single game as the Packers lost on the road by a score of 37–30.

Lazard finished the 2021 season with 40 receptions for 513 yards and eight touchdowns, all career highs. His five touchdowns over the final five weeks of the season were tied for second most in the NFL over that time span, second only to teammate Davante Adams.

==== 2022 season ====
On March 15, 2022, the Packers placed a second-round restricted free agent tender on Lazard. It was signed on June 13, 2022. In Week 4, against the New England Patriots, Lazard had six receptions for 116 receiving yards in the 27–24 overtime victory. In the 2022 season, Lazard appeared in and started 15 games. He finished with 60 receptions for 788 receiving yards and six receiving touchdowns.

=== New York Jets ===
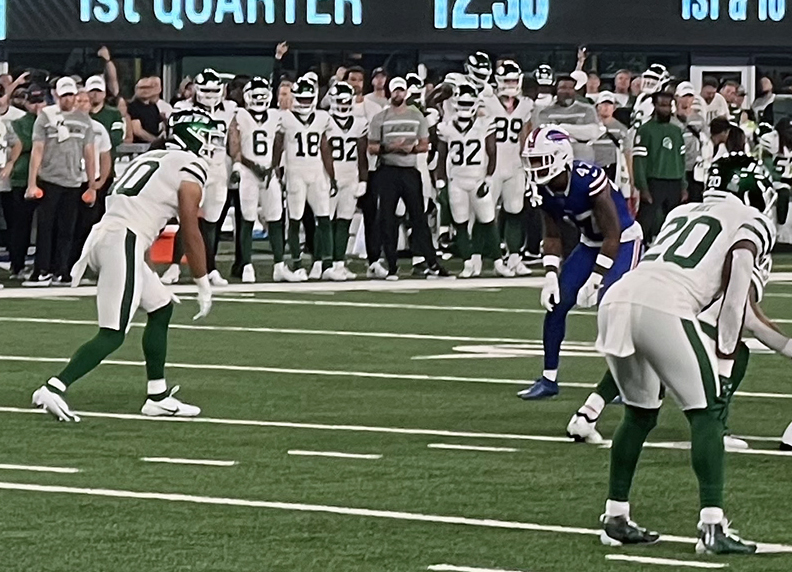
Lazard (#10) lining up against Christian Benford of the Buffalo Bills in 2023

On March 17, 2023, Lazard signed a four-year, $44 million contract with the New York Jets, preceding Rodgers' trade to New York from the Packers. In 14 games in the 2023 season, he finished with 23 receptions for 311 yards and one touchdown, playing without Rodgers under center for the vast majority of the season as the latter suffered a season-ending Achilles injury in week 1. With his signing seen by many as an "appeasement" move to get Rodgers to agree to the trade, Lazard was deactivated when Rodgers was ruled out the last two games of the season. He finished the 2023 season with 23 receptions for 311 yards and a touchdown.

The following season, Lazard caught Rodgers' first touchdown pass as a Jet during week 1. Despite dropping a crucial pass during the game's opening drive, Lazard finished with two touchdowns during the 32–19 loss to the San Francisco 49ers. In the first six games of 2024 alone, Lazard surpassed his total receptions and yards from the previous season and caught five touchdowns. On October 31, 2024, Lazard was placed on injured reserve due to a chest injury. He was activated on December 7. He finished the 2024 season with 37 receptions for 530 yards and six touchdowns.

On December 16, 2025, Lazard was released by the Jets. He finished the season with 10 catches for 70 yards and one touchdown.

== NFL career statistics ==
=== Regular season ===
| Year | Team | Games | | Receiving | | | | | Fumbles | |
| Year | Team | GP | GS | Rec | Yds | Avg | Lng | TD | Fum | Lost |
|---|---|---|---|---|---|---|---|---|---|---|
| 2018 | GB | 1 | 0 | 1 | 7 | 7.0 | 7 | 0 | 0 | 0 |
| 2019 | GB | 16 | 3 | 35 | 477 | 13.6 | 43 | 3 | 0 | 0 |
| 2020 | GB | 10 | 9 | 33 | 451 | 13.7 | 72 | 3 | 0 | 0 |
| 2021 | GB | 15 | 13 | 40 | 513 | 12.8 | 42 | 8 | 0 | 0 |
| 2022 | GB | 15 | 15 | 60 | 788 | 13.1 | 47 | 6 | 0 | 0 |
| 2023 | NYJ | 14 | 12 | 23 | 311 | 13.5 | 39 | 1 | 0 | 0 |
| 2024 | NYJ | 12 | 10 | 37 | 530 | 14.3 | 52 | 6 | 0 | 0 |
| 2025 | NYJ | 10 | 2 | 10 | 70 | 7.0 | 10 | 1 | 0 | 0 |
| Total | | 93 | 64 | 239 | 3,147 | 13.2 | 72 | 28 | 0 | 0 |

=== Postseason ===
| Year | Team | Games | | Receiving | | | | | Fumbles | |
| Year | Team | GP | GS | Rec | Yds | Avg | Lng | TD | Fum | Lost |
|---|---|---|---|---|---|---|---|---|---|---|
| 2019 | GB | 2 | 2 | 3 | 36 | 12.0 | 19 | 0 | 0 | 0 |
| 2020 | GB | 2 | 1 | 7 | 158 | 22.6 | 58 | 1 | 0 | 0 |
| 2021 | GB | 1 | 1 | 1 | 6 | 6.0 | 6 | 0 | 0 | 0 |
| Total | | 5 | 4 | 11 | 200 | 18.2 | 58 | 1 | 0 | 0 |
