= Troy Davis (running back) =

American football player (born 1975)

No. 28, 32, 23
- Position: Running back

Personal information
- Born: September 14, 1975 (age 51); Miami, Florida, U.S.
- Listed height: 5 ft 8 in (1.73 m)
- Listed weight: 183 lb (83 kg)

Career information
- High school: Miami Southridge
- College: Iowa State
- NFL draft: 1997: 3rd round, 62nd overall pick

Career history
- 1997–1999: New Orleans Saints
- 2001–2005: Hamilton Tiger-Cats
- 2005–2006: Edmonton Eskimos
- 2007: Toronto Argonauts

Awards and highlights
- NCAA: 2× Consensus All-American (1995, 1996); Big 12 Offensive Player of the Year (1996); First-team All-Big 12 (1996); First-team All-Big 8 (1995); Jim Brown Award (1996); Chic Harley Award (1996); CFL: Grey Cup champion (2005); CFL All-Star (2004); 2× CFL East All-Star (2002–2004); NCAA Division I records: Most rushing attempts in a single game: 53 (September 21, 1996)

Career NFL statistics
- Rushing attempts: 150
- Rushing yards: 446
- Receptions: 36
- Receiving yards: 237
- Stats at Pro Football Reference
- Stats at CFL.ca (archive)
- College Football Hall of Fame

Troy Davis (born September 14, 1975) is an American former professional football player who was a running back in the National Football League (NFL) and Canadian Football League (CFL). He played college football for the Iowa State Cyclones, finishing as a finalist for the Heisman Trophy. Davis twice earned consensus All-American honors and was the first and one of only two NCAA Division I-A running backs to rush for over 2,000 yards in back-to-back seasons. In 2016, he was inducted into the College Football Hall of Fame. He played professionally for the New Orleans Saints of the NFL, and the Hamilton Tiger-Cats, Edmonton Eskimos and Toronto Argonauts of the CFL, and was a member of the Eskimos' Grey Cup championship team in 2005.

== Early life ==
Davis was born in Miami, Florida. He attended Miami Southridge High School, where he was a standout high school football player for the Southridge Spartans.

He became the first Dade County football player to ever rush for 2,000 yards.

He had offers to play at Florida and Florida State among others but eventually chose Iowa State.

== College career ==
Davis attended Iowa State University, and played for the Iowa State Cyclones football team from 1994 to 1996. He played sparingly his freshman year under Jim Walden but flourished under new head coach Dan McCarney during Davis's final two seasons. Davis set numerous Cyclone team records, including most career rushing yards (4,382), total rushing yards in a single season (2,185), rushing yards in a game (378, vs. Missouri, rushing attempts in a game (53, vs. Northern Iowa, most rushing touchdowns in a game (5, vs. UNLV and vs. Northern Iowa), most 100-yard rushing games in a season (11) and career (21), most 200-yard rushing games in a season (5) and career (9), and most consecutive 100-yard rushing games (17, during 1995 and 1996 seasons), and most consecutive games scoring a touchdown (10, during 1995 and 1996 seasons).

He also held the Iowa State Cyclones football record for most career rushing touchdowns (36) and was tied for first for most career total touchdowns (38). He became the first running back in NCAA Division I-A (now Football Bowl Subdivision) history to gain 2,000 yards in two different seasons. During his three seasons at ISU, the Cyclones finished last in the Big Eight standings in his sophomore and junior seasons and last in the Big 12 North division standings his senior year.

In 1996, Davis was selected as the Big 12 Offensive Player of the Year. He was recognized as a consensus first-team All-American at running back in 1995 and 1996.

Davis finished fifth in voting for the Heisman Trophy in 1995. In 1996, he narrowly finished second to winner Danny Wuerffel. He won three out of four Heisman regions, but lost badly in the South region.

Davis was also nosed out for the Doak Walker Award by another Big 12 running back, Byron Hanspard of Texas Tech. Hanspard edged Davis for the award despite Hanspard earning a 0.00 grade point average during his final season playing for Texas Tech.

However, Davis did win the Jim Brown Award and the Chic Harley Award given to the top running back and best college football player respectively.

He was inducted into the Iowa State Hall of Fame in 2007.

Davis was inducted into the College Football Hall of Fame in 2016.

== Professional career ==
Davis elected to forgo his senior season of eligibility and declared for the 1997 NFL draft. He was drafted in the third round (62nd overall) by the New Orleans Saints. During his three seasons with the Saints Davis started 11 games and rushed for 446 yards on 150 attempts.

Davis left the Saints after the 1999 season and was drafted by the Birmingham Thunderbolts of the XFL, but was cut in training camp.

Davis then signed with the Hamilton Tiger-Cats of the CFL as a running back and kick-returner for the 2001 season. In 2004, he led the league in rushing and set the franchise record with 1,656 yards. He was traded mid-season in 2005 to the Edmonton Eskimos in exchange for a package headlined by Brock Ralph, Tay Cody, and the first overall draft pick in the 2006 Draft. He was able to play a key role in leading the Eskimos to winning the 93rd Grey Cup that year. On February 23, 2007, the Eskimos released Davis. He was later signed to the Toronto Argonauts practice roster on September 25, 2007. Davis was initially released by the Argonauts on October 17, 2007, but rejoined their practice roster on October 23, 2007.

== Career statistics ==
=== NFL ===
				Rushing						Receiving				Fumbles
Season	Team	GP	GS	Att	Yds	Avg	YdsG	Lng	TD	Rec	Yds	Lng	TD	Fum
1997	NO	16	7	75	271	3.6	16.9	20	-	13	85	18	-	3
1998	NO	14	2	55	143	2.6	10.2	14	1	16	99	19	-	1
1999	NO	16	2	20	32	1.6	2.0	7	-	7	53	20	-	1
Career		46	11	150	446	3.0	9.7	20	1	36	237	20	-	5

=== CFL ===
			Rushing						Receiving		
Season	Team	GP	Att	Yds	Avg	YdsG	Lng	TD	Rec	Yds	TD
2001	HAM	18	96	527	5.5	29.3	75	6	14	122	-
2002	HAM	18	230	1,143	5.0	63.5	74	6	27	221	1
2003	HAM	18	227	1,206	5.3	67.0	34	5	40	458	-
2004	HAM	18	324	1,628	5.0	90.4	58	10	40	250	-
2005	HAM		176	792	4.5	44.0	54	3	25	142	-
2005	EDM		64	359	5.6	19.9	30	2	17	157	-
2006	EDM	18	190	1,060	5.6	58.9	44	4	67	546	-
2007	TOR	18	6	24	4.0	1.3	10	-	-	-	-
Career		144	1,313	6,739	5.1	46.8	75	36	230	1,896	1

=== College ===
			Rushing				Receiving		
Season	Team	GP	Att	Yds	Avg	TD	Rec	Yds	TD
1994	Iowa State	9	35	187	5.3	0	6	35	0
1995	Iowa State	11	345	2,010	5.8	15	14	159	1
1996	Iowa State	11	402	2,185	5.4	21	13	64	0
	Career	31	782	4,382	5.6	36	33	258	1

== Personal life ==
Davis is the brother of Darren Davis, who played running back at Iowa State beginning in Troy's final season until 1999. Darren ran for over 1,000 yards in three consecutive seasons before ending his career second in career rushing yards behind his older brother.

== See also ==
- List of college football yearly rushing leaders
