= Alex Espinoza =

American football player (born 1964)

No. 12, 14
- Position: Quarterback

Personal information
- Born: May 31, 1964 (age 62); Los Angeles, California, U.S.
- Listed height: 6 ft 1 in (1.85 m)
- Listed weight: 193 lb (88 kg)

Career information
- High school: St. Paul (Santa Fe Springs, California)
- College: Cal State Fullerton; Iowa State
- NFL draft: 1987: undrafted

Career history
- Kansas City Chiefs (1987); Phoenix Cardinals (1989)*; Frankfurt Galaxy (1991-1992)
- * Offseason or practice squad member only

Awards and highlights
- Second-team All-Big Eight (1986)

Career NFL statistics
- Passing yards: 69
- TD–INT: 0–2
- Passer rating: 36.6
- Stats at Pro Football Reference

Alex A. Espinoza (born May 31, 1964) is an American former professional football player who was a quarterback for one season with the Kansas City Chiefs of the National Football League (NFL). He played college football for the Iowa State Cyclones after transferring from the Cal State Fullerton Titans. During the strike shortened season of 1987 he was picked up as an undrafted free agent to serve as a backup quarterback by Kansas City and played in only one game. He compiled 69 yards on 9 out of 14 attempts with two interceptions and five rushing yards in his lone NFL game, a 42–0 loss at Miami in his lone NFL year.
