= Darren Davis (Canadian football) =

American gridiron football player (born 1977)

No. 28
- Position: Running back

Personal information
- Born: March 1, 1977 (age 49); Miami, Florida, U.S.
- Listed height: 5 ft 8 in (1.73 m)
- Listed weight: 190 lb (86 kg)

Career information
- High school: Miami Southridge (Miami, Florida)
- College: Iowa State
- NFL draft: 2000: undrafted

Career history
- Saskatchewan Roughriders (2000–2001); Edmonton Eskimos (2002)*; Ottawa Renegades (2002–2003); Montreal Alouettes (2004)*
- * Offseason or practice squad member only

Awards and highlights
- First-team All-Big 12 (1999); 2× Second-team All-Big 12 (1997, 1998)

Darren Davis (born March 1, 1977) is an American former professional Canadian football running back who played in the Canadian Football League (CFL). Davis played college football at Iowa State University and was the first player in school history to rush for over 1,000 yards three times in a career.

== College career ==
Davis attended Iowa State from 1996 to 1999. He holds the current ISU record for most number of career rushing attempts (823). He finished his Cyclone career as the second all-time leading rusher and number of all-purpose yardage (behind his brother, Troy) in school history with 3,763 yards and 5,008 yards. As a sophomore, Davis rushed for a career-high 261 yards in a loss against Kansas. In his senior season, Davis led the Big 12 in rushing yards (1,388). He also ranks seventh on the all-time Iowa State career rushing touchdown list with 26.

== Professional career ==
From 2000 through 2001, he played for the Saskatchewan Roughriders. He rushed for 1,024 and 1,243 yards with the Saskatchewan Roughriders in 2000 and 2001, before being dealt to the Edmonton Eskimos on Feb. 19, 2002. The Eskimos then sent Davis to Ottawa four months later. From 2002-2003, he played for the now defunct Ottawa Renegades. He rushed for 247 yards in 2002, and 298 yards in 2003. He then signed on with the Montreal Alouettes, but was cut before making the final roster.

== Personal life ==
He is the brother of former New Orleans Saints and Canadian Football League running back Troy Davis.
