= Ray Donels =

American football coach

Biographical details
- Born: March 19, 1902; Shellsburg, Iowa, U.S.
- Died: April 15, 1973 (aged 71); Rochester, Minnesota, U.S.

Coaching career (HC unless noted)
- 1941–1942: Iowa State

Head coaching record
- Overall: 3–8–1

Ray Oliver Donels (March 19, 1902 – April 15, 1973) was an American football coach. He served as head football coach at Iowa State University from 1941 until midway through the 1942 season, compiling a record of 3–8–1. He resigned on October 14, 1942.

Donels was coach of the Iowa State freshman football and basketball teams for the 1938 season. As the football coach with Kenny Wells at Ames High School, the Little Cyclones won every game in its 1937 fall season schedule. Donels also coached the Ames High boys basketball team for nine seasons from 1929 until 1938, compiling a 127–65 overall record. Ames won the 1936 state championship under Donels' direction.

Donels was born in Shellsburg, Iowa. He attended Iowa State as an undergraduate in the class of 1928. He became a brother of Delta Chi Fraternity on October 13, 1923, when the fraternity chapter celebrated its chartering at Iowa State. Donels died on April 15, 1973, at a hospital in Rochester, Minnesota.

== Head coaching record ==
Year	Team	Overall	Conference	Standing	Bowl/playoffs
Iowa State Cyclones (Big Six Conference) (1941–1942)
1941	Iowa State	2–6–1	0–4–1	6th	
1942	Iowa State	1–2 (Note: Donels resigned after three games. Mike Michalske served as head coach for the final six games of the season. Iowa State finished the 1942 season with an overall record of 3–6 and tied for the fifth place in the conference with a mark of 1–4.)	0–1		
Iowa State:		3–8–1	0–5–1		
Total:		3–8–1			
