= Barry Hill (American football) =

American football player (1953–2010)

No. 44
- Position: Defensive back

Personal information
- Born: January 26, 1953; Eglin Air Force Base, Florida, U.S.
- Died: December 29, 2010 (aged 57)
- Listed height: 6 ft 3 in (1.91 m)
- Listed weight: 185 lb (84 kg)

Career information
- College: Iowa State
- NFL draft: 1975: 5th round, 127th overall pick

Career history
- Miami Dolphins (1975–1976)

Awards and highlights
- First-team All-Big Eight (1974)
- Stats at Pro Football Reference

Barry Stephen Hill (January 26, 1953 - December 29, 2010) is an American former professional football player who was a defensive back for the Miami Dolphins of the National Football League (NFL). He played college football for the Iowa State Cyclones and was selected in the fifth round of the 1975 NFL draft. He enjoyed a successful rookie campaign with the Dolphins, winning the teams' Tommy Fitzgerald Award as the outstanding rookie in training camp as well as being named the Outstanding Special Teams Player.

== College ==
Barry Hill was a three-year letterman in college, playing cornerback and safety for the Cyclones from 1972 to 1974.

Hill was generally regarded as the best athlete on the ISU campus after starring in football and basketball at Carver High School in Delray Beach, Fla. Hill turned down a basketball scholarship from Brown University.
