= 2014 Iowa State Cyclones football team =

American college football season

2014 Iowa State Cyclones football
- Conference: Big 12 Conference
- Record: 2–10 (0–9 Big 12)
- Head coach: Paul Rhoads (6th season)
- Offensive coordinator: Mark Mangino (1st season)
- Offensive scheme: Spread
- Defensive coordinator: Wally Burnham (6th season)
- Base defense: 4–3
- Home stadium: Jack Trice Stadium

2014 Big 12 Conference football standings
	Conf.			Overall
Team	W		L	W		L
No. 7 Baylor +	8	–	1	11	–	2
No. 3 TCU +	8	–	1	12	–	1
No. 18 Kansas State	7	–	2	9	–	4
Oklahoma	5	–	4	8	–	5
West Virginia	5	–	4	7	–	6
Texas	5	–	4	6	–	7
Oklahoma State	4	–	5	7	–	6
Texas Tech	2	–	7	4	–	8
Kansas	1	–	8	3	–	9
Iowa State	0	–	9	2	–	10
+ – Conference co-champions; Rankings from AP Poll

The 2014 Iowa State Cyclones football team represented Iowa State University as a member of Big 12 Conference during the 2014 NCAA Division I FBS football season. Led by sixth-year head coach Paul Rhoads, the Cyclones compiled an overall record of 2–10 with a mark of 0–9 in conference play, placing last out of ten teams in the Big 12. The team played home games at Jack Trice Stadium in Ames, Iowa.

== Schedule ==
Date	Time	Opponent	Site	TV	Result	Attendance	Source
August 30	11:00 a.m.	No. 2 (FCS) North Dakota State*	Jack Trice Stadium; Ames, IA	FS1	L 14–34	54,800	
September 6	11:00 a.m.	No. 20 Kansas State	Jack Trice Stadium; Ames, IA (rivalry)	FS1	L 28–32	54,800	
September 13	2:30 p.m.	at Iowa*	Kinnick Stadium; Iowa City, IA (rivalry)	ESPN	W 20–17	70,585	
September 27	7:00 p.m.	No. 7 Baylor	Jack Trice Stadium; Ames, IA	FOX	L 28–49	51,776	
October 4	11:00 a.m.	at No. 21 Oklahoma State	Boone Pickens Stadium; Stillwater, OK	FS1	L 20–37	52,608	
October 11	2:30 p.m.	Toledo*^{†}	Jack Trice Stadium; Ames, IA	Cyclones.tv	W 37–30	52,281	
October 18	7:00 p.m.	at Texas	Darrell K Royal–Texas Memorial Stadium; Austin, TX	LHN, Cyclones.tv	L 45–48	92,017	
November 1	11:00 a.m.	No. 19 Oklahoma	Jack Trice Stadium; Ames, IA	FS1	L 14–59	50,784	
November 8	2:30 p.m.	at Kansas	Memorial Stadium; Lawrence, KS	FSN	L 14–34	33,288	
November 22	2:30 p.m.	Texas Tech	Jack Trice Stadium; Ames, IA	FSN	L 31–34	50,877	
November 29	11:00 a.m.	West Virginia	Jack Trice Stadium; Ames, IA	FS1	L 24–37	50,059	
December 6	11:00 a.m.	at No. 3 TCU	Amon G. Carter Stadium; Fort Worth, TX	ABC	L 3–55	45,242	
*Non-conference game; ^{†}Homecoming; Rankings from AP Poll released prior to the game; All times are in Central time

== Game summaries ==
=== Game 1: vs. North Dakota State Bison ===
Game One: North Dakota State Bison at Iowa State Cyclones – Game summary

Quarter	1	2	3	4	Total
Bison	0	17	10	7	34
Cyclones	7	7	0	0	14

at Jack Trice Stadium, Ames, IA

- Date: August 30
- Game time: 11:05 a.m. CDT
- Game weather: Temperature: 78° • Wind: NW 5-10 • Weather: mostly cloudy
- Game attendance: 54,800
- Referee: Referee: Rick Loumiet • Umpire: Rick Podraza • Linesman: Bill Scott • Line judge: Keith Garmond • Back judge: Donnie Aultman • Field judge: Jason Ledet • Side judge: Jim Murphy
- TV announcers (FS1): Justin Kutcher (Play-by-play) & Coy Wire (Color)

Game information

First quarter

- ISU – 11:31 Aaron Wimberly 16 yd run, Cole Netten XP good (ISU 7–0)

Second quarter

- ISU – 14:03 Aaron Wimberly 3 yd run, Cole Netten XP good (ISU 14–0)
- NDSU – 13:46 John Crockett 80 yd run, Adam Keller XP good (ISU 14–7)
- NDSU – 04:42 John Crockett 1 yd run, Adam Keller XP good (Tied 14–14)
- NDSU – 00:00 Adam Keller 19 yd field goal good (NDSU 17–14)

Third quarter

- NDSU – 05:52 Adam Keller 21 yd field goal good (NDSU 20–14)
- NDSU – 01:36 John Crockett 3 yd run, Adam Keller XP good (NDSU 27–14)

Fourth quarter

- NDSU – 05:20 Chase Morlock 66 yd run, Adam Keller XP good (NDSU 34–14)

Top passers

- NDSU – Carson Wentz 18/28, 204 yards
- ISU – Sam B. Richardson 20/31, 151 yards, 2 INT

Top rushers

- NDSU – John Crockett 17 attempts, 138 yards, 3 TD
- ISU – Sam B. Richardson 15 attempts, 58 yards

Top receivers

- NDSU – Zach Vraa 7 receptions, 82 yards
- ISU – Dondre Daley 5 receptions, 32 yards

Top tacklers

- NDSU – Kyle Emanuel 9 tackles
- ISU – Nigel Tribune 11 tackles

=== Game 2: vs. Kansas State Wildcats ===
Game Two: Kansas State Wildcats at Iowa State Cyclones – Game summary

Quarter	1	2	3	4	Total
Wildcats	13	7	0	12	32
Cyclones	7	21	0	0	28

at Jack Trice Stadium, Ames, IA

- Date: September 6
- Game time: 11:05 a.m. CDT
- Game weather: Temperature: 72° • Wind: N 5 • Weather: Clear
- Game attendance: 54,800
- Referee: Referee: Greg Burks • Umpire: Scott Campbell • Linesman: George Gusman • Line judge: Jerod Phillips • Back judge: Brian Ernest • Field judge: Randy Smith • Side judge: Gene Semko
- TV announcers (FS1): Justin Kutcher (Play-by-play) & Coy Wire (Color)

Game information

First quarter

- KSU – 13:05 Charles Jones 4 yd run, Jack Cantele XP good (KSU 7–0)
- KSU – 10:25 Jack Cantele 27 yd field goal good (KSU 10–0)
- KSU – 03:40 Jack Cantele 41 yd field goal good (KSU 13–0)
- ISU – 00:13 Jarvis West 17 yd pass from Sam B. Richardson, Cole Netten XP good (KSU 13–7)

Second quarter

- ISU – 12:37 Jarvis West 82 yd punt return, Cole Netten XP good (ISU 14–13)
- ISU – 04:33 DeVondrick Nealy 2 yd run, Jack Cantele XP good (ISU 21–13)
- ISU – 01:36 Allen Lazard 29 yd pass from Jarvis West, Cole Netten XP good (ISU 28–13)
- KSU – 00:26 Jake Waters 1 yd run, Jack Cantele XP good (ISU 28–20)

Fourth quarter

- KSU – 08:01 Charles Jones 4 yd run, two–point conversion no good (ISU 28–26)
- KSU – 01:30 Jake Waters 8 yd run, two–point conversion no good (KSU 34–28)

Top passers

- KSU – Jake Waters 16/29, 239 yards
- ISU – Sam B. Richardson 21/30, 185 yards, 1 TD, 1 INT

Top rushers

- KSU – Jake Waters 20 attempts, 138 yards, 2 TD
- ISU – DeVondrick Nealy 10 attempts, 38 yards, 1 TD

Top receivers

- KSU – Tyler Lockett 6 receptions, 136 yards
- ISU – Jarvis West 8 receptions, 75 yards, 1 TD

Top tacklers

- KSU – Jonathan Truman 10 tackles
- ISU – Jevohn Miller 11 tackles

Kansas State won its first game and entered the game with a record of 1–0, while Iowa State had just came off a loss against North Dakota State. Prior to the game, Iowa State has lost 32 of its last 36 games against ranked opponents while Kansas State had won the last six meetings overall after last season's 41-7 win. When ranked, the Wildcats have defeated the Cyclones in 10 straight dating to 1994.

The game began with Kansas State taking an early lead 13–0 in the first quarter, but Iowa State scored a touchdown before the quarter concluded. That Iowa State touchdown was the first of four consecutive for the cyclones which led them in with a 28–20 lead at halftime. Neither team scored in the third period and Kansas State's defense continued the fourth quarter to prevent any score, allowing the Kansas State offense to produce two more touchdowns and a Wildcat victory 32–28. The comeback-from-behind victory was considered "defining" for Kansas State.

During the game, Kansas State wide receiver Tyler Lockett caught a pass near the goal line on the sidelines. In this play, it appeared that his knee appeared touched a pylon. That event would by rule negate the catch. The Wildcats scored a touchdown on the next play, which prevented any additional video review. The Big 12 replay official and communicator were given a one-game suspension for failing to follow protocol.

=== Game 3: at Iowa Hawkeyes ===
Game Three: Iowa State Cyclones at Iowa Hawkeyes – Game summary

Quarter	1	2	3	4	Total
Cyclones	0	3	7	10	20
Hawkeyes	7	7	0	3	17

at Kinnick Stadium, Iowa City, IA

- Date: September 13
- Game time: 2:40 p.m. CDT
- Game weather: Temperature: 60° • Wind: NW 2 • Weather: Sunny
- Game attendance: 70,585
- Referee: Referee: Alan Eck • Umpire: Tab Slaughter • Linesman: Doug Moore • Line judge: Kevin Vicknair • Back judge: Brad Van Vark • Field judge: Scott Gaines • Side judge: Anthony Fleming
- TV announcers (ESPN): Sean McDonough (Play-by-play), Chris Spielman (Color) & Todd McShay (Sideline)

Game information

First quarter

- IOWA – 02:53 Mark Weisman 1 yd run, Mick Ellis XP good (IOWA 7–0)

Second quarter

- ISU – 13:44 Cole Netten 47 yd field goal good (IOWA 7–3)
- IOWA – 03:52 Jake Rudock 5 yd run, Mick Ellis XP good (IOWA 14–3)

Third quarter

- ISU – 06:50 E. J. Bibbs 1 yd pass from Sam B. Richardson, Cole Netten XP good (IOWA 14–10)

Fourth quarter

- ISU – 07:33 DeVondrick Nealy 27 yd pass from Sam B. Richardson, Cole Netten XP good (ISU 17–14)
- IOWA – 04:08 Marshall Koehn 44 yd field goal good (Tied 17–17)
- ISU – 00:02 Cole Netten 42 yd field goal good (ISU 20–17)

Top passers

- ISU – Sam B. Richardson 25/37, 255 yards, 2 TD
- IOWA – Jake Rudock 16/24, 146 yards, 1 INT

Top rushers

- ISU – Aaron Wimberly 11 attempts, 33 yards
- IOWA – Mark Weisman 16 attempts, 49 yards, 1 TD

Top receivers

- ISU – Allen Lazard 5 receptions, 53 yards
- IOWA – Ray Hamilton 2 receptions, 41 yards

Top tacklers

- ISU – Jevohn Miller 9 tackles
- IOWA – Quinton Alston 10 tackles

=== Game 4: vs. Baylor Bears ===
Game Four: Baylor Bears at Iowa State Cyclones – Game summary

Quarter	1	2	3	4	Total
Bears	14	21	14	0	49
Cyclones	7	0	14	7	28

at Jack Trice Stadium, Ames, IA

- Date: September 27
- Game time: 7:20 p.m. CDT
- Game weather: Temperature: 74° • Wind: SSE 5 • Weather: Partly cloudy
- Game attendance: 51,776
- Referee: Referee: Dan Romeo • Umpire: Scott Teifer • Linesman: Al Green • Line judge: Marc Bovos • Back judge: Chris Alston • Field judge: Ed Vinzant • Side judge: Craig Faulkner
- TV announcers (FOX): Joe Davis (Play-by-play), Joey Harrington (Color) & Kris Budden (Sideline)

Game information

First quarter

- BAY – 09:58 Shock Linwood 2 yd run, Chris Callahan XP good (BAY 7–0)
- BAY – 07:51 Bryce Petty 16 yd run, Chris Callahan XP good (BAY 14–0)
- ISU – 02:26 Dondre Daley 11 yd pass from Sam B. Richardson, Cole Netten XP good (BAY 14–7)

Second quarter

- BAY – 13:51 Corey Coleman 25 yd pass from Bryce Petty, Chris Callahan XP good (BAY 21–7)
- BAY – 08:45 Shock Linwood 24 yd run, Chris Callahan XP good (BAY 28–7)
- BAY – 04:36 Johnny Jefferson 12 yd run, Chris Callahan XP good (BAY 35–7)

Third quarter

- ISU – 13:52 Sam B. Richardson 47 yd run, Cole Netten XP good (BAY 35–14)
- BAY – 11:06 Shock Linwood 7 yd run, Chris Callahan XP good (BAY 42–14)
- ISU – 07:01 Aaron Wimberly 1 yd run, Cole Netten XP good (BAY 42–21)
- BAY – 00:54 Bryce Petty 1 yd run, Chris Callahan XP good (BAY 49–21)

Fourth quarter

- ISU – 04:42 Tad Ecby 51 yd pass from Sam B. Richardson, Cole Netten XP good (BAY 49–28)

Top passers

- BAY – Bryce Petty 30/44, 336 yards, 1 TD, 1 INT
- ISU – Sam B. Richardson 17/39, 212 yards, 2 TD, 1 INT

Top rushers

- BAY – Shock Linwood 15 attempts, 82 yards, 3 TD
- ISU – Sam B. Richardson 14 attempts, 99 yards, 1 TD

Top receivers

- BAY – Corey Coleman 12 receptions, 154 yards, 1 TD
- ISU – Tad Ecby 1 receptions, 51 yards, 1 TD

Top tacklers

- BAY – Aiavion Edwards 11 tackles
- ISU – Jevohn Miller 17 tackles

=== Game 5: at Oklahoma State Cowboys ===
Game Five: Iowa State Cyclones at Oklahoma State Cowboys – Game summary

Quarter	1	2	3	4	Total
Cyclones	0	6	7	7	20
Cowboys	0	13	17	7	37

at Boone Pickens Stadium, Stillwater, OK

- Date: October 4
- Game time: 11:07 a.m. CDT
- Game weather: Temperature: 62° • Wind: W 6 • Weather: Sunny
- Game attendance: 52,608
- Referee: Referee: Cooper Castleberry • Umpire: Kevin Matthews • Linesman: Tim Crowley • Line judge: Frank LeBlanc • Back judge: Joel Wetzel • Field judge: Bobby Bernard • Side judge: Dave Curschman
- TV announcers (FS1): Tim Brando (Play-by-play) & Brady Quinn (Color)

Game information

Second quarter

- ISU – 13:04 Cole Netten 34 yd field goal good (ISU 3–0)
- ISU – 07:02 Cole Netten 34 yd field goal good (ISU 6–0)
- OSU – 02:57 Ben Grogan 34 yd field goal good (ISU 6–3)
- OSU – 00:43 Ben Grogan 30 yd field goal good (Tied 6–6)
- OSU – 00:00 Desmond Roland 2 yd run, Ben Grogan XP good (OSU 13–6)

Third quarter

- OSU – 14:49 Tyreek Hill 97 yd kickoff return, Ben Grogan XP good (OSU 20–6)
- ISU – 10:02 E. J. Bibbs 17 yd pass from Sam B. Richardson, Cole Netten XP good (OSU 20–13)
- OSU – 07:54 Jhajuan Seales 40 yd pass from Daxx Garman, Ben Grogan XP good (OSU 27–13)
- OSU – 04:30 Ben Grogan 34 yd field goal good (OSU 30–13)

Fourth quarter

- OSU – 14:55 Desmond Roland 6 yd run, Ben Grogan XP good (OSU 37–13)
- ISU – 00:50 E. J. Bibbs 7 yd pass from Sam B. Richardson, Cole Netten XP good (OSU 37–20)

Top passers

- ISU – Sam B. Richardson 17/39, 200 yards, 2 TD
- OSU – Daxx Garman 26/41, 271 yards, 1 TD, 2 INT

Top rushers

- ISU – Aaron Wimberly 10 attempts, 44 yards
- OSU – Desmond Roland 19 attempts, 95 yards, 2 TD

Top receivers

- ISU – E. J. Bibbs 6 receptions, 69 yards, 2 TD
- OSU – Brandon Sheperd 8 receptions, 91 yards

Top tacklers

- ISU – Jevohn Miller 9 tackles
- OSU – Josh Furman 10 tackles

=== Game 6: vs. Toledo Rockets ===
Game Six: Toledo Rockets at Iowa State Cyclones – Game summary

Quarter	1	2	3	4	Total
Rockets	3	10	7	10	30
Cyclones	6	3	14	14	37

at Jack Trice Stadium, Ames, IA

- Date: October 11
- Game time: 2:35 p.m. CDT
- Game weather: Temperature: 66° • Wind: S 5 • Weather: Clear
- Game attendance: 52,281
- Referee: Referee: Larry Smith • Umpire: Mark Shupe • Linesman: Michael T. Mahouski • Line judge: Ric Hinkamper • Back judge: Jake Kemp • Field judge: Brad Horchem • Side judge: Jason Nickleby
- TV announcers (Cyclones.tv): John Walters (Play-by-play), Eric Heft (Color) & Ben Bruns (Sideline)

Game information

First quarter

- TOL – 10:32 Jeremiah Detmer 27 yd field goal good (TOL 3–0)
- ISU – 07:05 Cole Netten 32 yd field goal good (Tied 3–3)
- ISU – 00:03 Cole Netten 36 yd field goal good (ISU 6–3)

Second quarter

- TOL – 10:48 Terry Swanson 14 yd run, Jeremiah Detmer XP good (TOL 10–6)
- TOL – 03:20 Jeremiah Detmer 29 yd field goal good (TOL 13–6)
- ISU – 00:13 Cole Netten 38 yd field goal good (TOL 13–9)

Third quarter

- ISU – 12:11 Tad Ecby 23 yd pass from Sam B. Richardson, Cole Netten XP good (ISU 16–13)
- ISU – 08:04 Martinez Syria 1 yd run, Cole Netten XP good (ISU 23–13)
- TOL – 04:01 Terry Swanson 1 yd run, Jeremiah Detmer XP good (ISU 23–20)

Fourth quarter

- TOL – 13:38 Jeremiah Detmer 41 yd field goal good (TOL 23–23)
- ISU – 10:23 E. J. Bibbs 5 yd pass from Sam B. Richardson, Cole Netten XP good (ISU 30–23)
- ISU – 03:35 Allen Lazard 14 yd pass from Sam B. Richardson, Cole Netten XP good (ISU 37–23)
- TOL – 00:56 Marc Remy 4 yd pass from Logan Woodside, Jeremiah Detmer XP good (ISU 37–30)

Top passers

- TOL – Logan Woodside 22/36, 189 yards, 1 TD
- ISU – Sam B. Richardson 37/53, 351 yards, 3 TD

Top rushers

- TOL – Terry Swanson 17 attempts, 124 yards, 1 TD
- ISU – DeVondrick Nealy 16 attempts, 71 yards

Top receivers

- TOL – Corey Jones 12 receptions, 118 yards
- ISU – Allen Lazard 8 receptions, 96 yards, 1 TD

Top tacklers

- TOL – Ray Bush 11 tackles
- ISU – Kamari Cotton–Moya 12 tackles

=== Game 7: at Texas Longhorns ===
Game Seven: Iowa State Cyclones at Texas Longhorns – Game summary

Quarter	1	2	3	4	Total
Cyclones	7	21	3	14	45
Longhorns	14	14	3	17	48

at Darrell K Royal–Texas Memorial Stadium, Austin, TX

- Date: October 18
- Game time: 7:05 p.m. CDT
- Game weather: Temperature: 83° • Wind: ENE 7 • Weather: Clear
- Game attendance: 92,017
- Referee: Referee: Rick Loumiet • Umpire: Rick Podraza • Linesman: Bill Scott • Line judge: Keith Garmond • Back judge: Donnie Aultman • Field judge: Jason Ledet • Side judge: Jim Murphy
- TV announcers (LHN/Cyclones.tv): Brent Blum (Play-by-play) & Sage Rosenfels (Color)

Game information

First quarter

- TEX – 12:43 Marcus Johnson 28 yd pass from Tyrone Swoopes, Nick Rose XP good (TEX 7–0)
- TEX – 07:22 Johnathan Gray 2 yd run, Nick Rose XP good (TEX 14–0)
- ISU – 04:04 E. J. Bibbs 4 yd pass from Sam B. Richardson, Cole Netten XP good (TEX 14–7)

Second quarter

- ISU – 14:37 Jevohn Miller 51 yd fumble recovery, Cole Netten XP good (Tied 14–14)
- ISU – 10:53 Allen Lazard 8 yd pass from Sam B. Richardson, Cole Netten XP good (ISU 21–14)
- TEX – 06:45 Tyrone Swoopes 9 yd run, Nick Rose XP good (Tied 21–21)
- TEX – 02:50 Dylan Haines 74 yd interception return, Nick Rose XP good (TEX 28–21)
- ISU – 00:03 Sam B. Richardson 5 yd run, Cole Netten XP good (Tied 28–28)

Third quarter

- TEX – 04:15 Nick Rose 45 yd field goal good (TEX 31–28)
- ISU – 00:19 Cole Netten 21 yd field goal good (Tied 31–31)

Fourth quarter

- TEX – 10:22 Malcolm Brown 1 yd run, Nick Rose XP good (TEX 38–31)
- ISU – 05:24 Aaron Wimberly 8 yd run, Cole Netten XP good (Tied 38–38)
- TEX – 01:19 Malcolm Brown 4 yd run, Nick Rose XP good (TEX 45–38)
- ISU – 00:28 E. J. Bibbs 11 yd pass from Sam B. Richardson, Cole Netten XP good (Tied 45–45)
- TEX – 00:03 Nick Rose 21 yd field goal good (TEX 48–45)

Top passers

- ISU – Sam B. Richardson 36/55, 345 yards, 3 TD, 2 INT
- TEX – Tyrone Swoopes 24/36, 321 yards, 1 TD, 1 INT

Top rushers

- ISU – Aaron Wimberly 14 attempts, 110 yards, 1 TD
- TEX – Tyrone Swoopes 14 attempts, 95 yards, 1 TD

Top receivers

- ISU – D'Vario Montgomery 9 receptions, 100 yards
- TEX – John Harris 9 receptions, 147 yards

Top tacklers

- ISU – T. J. Mutcherson 9 tackles
- TEX – Jordan Hicks 13 tackles

=== Game 8: vs. Oklahoma Sooners ===
Game Eight: Oklahoma Sooners at Iowa State Cyclones – Game summary

Quarter	1	2	3	4	Total
Sooners	21	14	17	7	59
Cyclones	0	7	7	0	14

at Jack Trice Stadium, Ames, IA

- Date: November 1
- Game time: 11:05 a.m. CDT
- Game weather: Temperature: 34° • Wind: SSE 5 • Weather: Partly cloudy
- Game attendance: 50,784
- Referee: Referee: Randy Christal • Umpire: Jim Adams • Linesman: Cal McNeill • Line judge: Kelly Deterding • Back judge: Terry Jones • Field judge: Joe Blubaugh • Side judge: Freeman Johns
- TV announcers (FS1): Craig Bolerjack (Play-by-play) & Ryan Nece (Color)

Game information

First Quarter

- OU – 13:38 Trevor Knight 31 yd run, Michael Hunnicutt XP good (OU 7–0)
- OU – 09:52 K. J. Young 16 yd pass from Trevor Knight, Michael Hunnicutt XP good (OU 14–0)
- OU – 02:42 Blake Bell 5 yd pass from Trevor Knight, Michael Hunnicutt XP good (OU 21–0)

Second Quarter

- ISU – 14:18 Sam B. Richardson 18 yd run, Cole Netten XP good (OU 21–7)
- OU – 06:44 Samaje Perine 7 yd run, Michael Hunnicutt XP good (OU 28–7)
- OU – 04:03 Trevor Knight 8 yd run, Michael Hunnicutt XP good (OU 35–7)

Third Quarter

- OU – 11:20 Michael Hunnicutt 44 Yard field goal (OU 38–7)
- OU – 06:43 Blake Bell 17 yd pass from Trevor Knight, Michael Hunnicutt XP good (OU 45–7)
- ISU – 06:14 D'Vario Montgomery 59 yd pass from Sam B. Richardson, Cole Netten XP good (OU 45–14)
- OU – 02:55 Trevor Knight 9 yd run, Michael Hunnicutt XP good (OU 52–14)

Fourth Quarter

- OU – 05:12 David Smith 8 yd run, Michael Hunnicutt XP good (OU 59–14)

Top Passers

- OU – Trevor Knight 22/35, 230 yards, 3 TD, 2 INT
- ISU – Sam B. Richardson 15/40, 239 yards, 1 TD

Top Rushers

- OU – Trevor Knight 16 attempts, 146 yards, 3 TD
- ISU – Tyler Brown 8 attempts, 48 yards

Top Receiving

- OU – Durron Neal 5 receptions, 60 yards
- ISU – D'Vario Montgomery 3 receptions, 88 yards, 1 TD

Top Tacklers

- OU – Dominique Alexander 7 tackles
- ISU – Kenneth Lynn 10 tackles

=== Game 9: at Kansas Jayhawks ===
Game Nine: Iowa State Cyclones at Kansas Jayhawks – Game summary

Quarter	1	2	3	4	Total
Cyclones	0	7	7	0	14
Jayhawks	14	7	7	3	31

at Memorial Stadium, Lawrence, KS

- Date: November 8
- Game time: 2:35 p.m. CST
- Game weather: Temperature: 53° • Wind: NNW 20 • Weather: Sunny
- Game attendance: 33,288
- Referee: Referee: Cooper Castleberry • Umpire: Kevin Matthews • Linesman: Tim Crowley • Line judge: Frank LeBlanc • Back judge: Joel Wetzel • Field judge: Bobby Bernard • Side judge: Dave Curschman
- TV announcers (FSN): Brendan Burke (Play-by-play), Ben Leber (Color) & Christian Steckel (Sideline)

Game information

First quarter

- KU – 09:21 Corey Avery 14 yd run, Matthew Wyman XP good (KU 7–0)
- KU – 04:24 Jimmay Mundine 20 yd pass from Michael Cummings, Matthew Wyman XP good (KU 14–0)
- KU – 00:41 Matthew Wyman 35 yd field goal good (KU 17–0)

Second quarter

- KU – 05:25 Tony Pierson 6 yd run, Matthew Wyman XP good (KU 24–0)
- ISU – 01:13 E. J. Bibbs 3 yd pass from Grant Rohach, Cole Netten XP good (KU 24–7)

Third quarter

- ISU – 13:53 D'Vario Montgomery 35 yd pass from Grant Rohach, Cole Netten XP good (KU 24–14)
- KU – 02:49 Michael Cummings 1 yd run, Matthew Wyman XP good (KU 31–14)

Fourth quarter

- KU – 13:13 Matthew Wyman 37 yd field goal good (KU 34–14)

Top passers

- ISU – Grant Rohach 25/50, 275 yards, 2 TD, 1 INT
- KU – Michael Cummings 24/40, 278 yards, 1 TD

Top rushers

- ISU – Aaron Wimberly 15 attempts, 97 yards
- KU – Corey Avery 17 attempts, 103 yards, 1 TD

Top receivers

- ISU – D'Vario Montgomery 8 receptions, 130 yards, 1 TD
- KU – Nigel King 5 receptions, 101 yards

Top tacklers

- ISU – Kane Seeley 13 tackles
- KU – Ben Heeney 7 tackles

=== Game 10: vs. Texas Tech Red Raiders ===
Game Ten: Texas Tech Red Raiders at Iowa State Cyclones – Game summary

Quarter	1	2	3	4	Total
Red Raiders	14	0	13	7	34
Cyclones	7	10	7	7	31

at Jack Trice Stadium, Ames, IA

- Date: November 22
- Game time: 2:35 p.m. CST
- Game weather: Temperature: 54° • Wind: SW 5 • Weather: Sunny
- Game attendance: 50,877
- Referee: Referee: Alan Eck • Umpire: Jim Adams • Linesman: Doug Moore • Line judge: Kevin Vicknair • Back judge: Terry White • Field judge: Nick Lave • Side judge: Anthony Fleming
- TV announcers (FSN): Brendan Burke (Play-by-play), Ben Leber (Color) & Christian Steckel (Sideline)

Game information

First quarter

- TTU – 10:57 DeAndre Washington 26 yd pass from Patrick Mahomes, Ryan Bustin XP good (TTU 7–0)
- TTU – 05:47 DeAndre Washington 72 yd run, Ryan Bustin XP good (TTU 14–0)
- ISU – 00:38 E. J. Bibbs 13 yd pass from Sam B. Richardson, Cole Netten XP good (TTU 14–7)

Second quarter

- ISU – 09:29 Tyler Brown 11 yd pass from Sam B. Richardson, Cole Netten XP good (Tied 14–14)
- ISU – 00:38 Cole Netten 22 yd field goal good (ISU 17–14)

Third quarter

- ISU – 10:57 Aaron Wimberly 2 yd run, Cole Netten XP good (ISU 24–14)
- TTU – 08:30 Devin Lauderdale 13 yd pass from Patrick Mahomes, Ryan Bustin XP good (ISU 24–21)
- TTU – 04:17 Devin Lauderdale 82 yd pass from Patrick Mahomes, Ryan Bustin XP good (TTU 28–24)

Fourth quarter

- ISU – 13:44 Aaron Wimberly 3 yd run, Cole Netten XP good (ISU 31–28)
- TTU – 04:07 Kenny Williams 44 yd pass from Patrick Mahomes, Ryan Bustin XP good (TTU 34–31)

Top Passers

- TTU – Patrick Mahomes 23/35, 328 yards, 4 TD, 1 INT
- ISU – Sam B. Richardson 24/38, 304 yards, 2 TD

Top Rushers

- TTU – DeAndre Washington 20 attempts, 186 yards, 1 TD
- ISU – Aaron Wimberly 19 attempts, 102 yards, 2 TD

Top Receiving

- TTU – Devin Lauderdale 2 receptions, 95 yards, 2 TD
- ISU – Tad Ecby 2 receptions, 100 yards

Top Tacklers

- TTU – Tevin Madison 11 tackles
- ISU – T. J. Mutcherson 9 tackles

=== Game 11: vs. West Virginia Mountaineers ===
Game Eleven: West Virginia Mountaineers at Iowa State Cyclones – Game summary

Quarter	1	2	3	4	Total
Mountaineers	7	20	0	10	37
Cyclones	14	7	3	0	24

at Jack Trice Stadium, Ames, IA

- Date: November 29
- Game time: 11:05 a.m. CST
- Game weather: Temperature: 45° • Wind: WSW 5 • Weather: Clear
- Game attendance: 50,059
- Referee: Referee: Reggie Smith • Umpire: Michael Cooper • Linesman: Mike Moeller • Line judge: Mark Stewart • Back judge: Lyndon Nixon • Field judge: Matt Mills • Side judge: Tim Murray
- TV announcers (FS1): Craig Bolerjack (Play-by-play), Ryan Nece (Color) & Julie Stewart–Binks (Sideline)

Game information

First quarter

- WVU – 12:50 Rushel Shell 54 yd run, Josh Lambert XP good (WVU 7–0)
- ISU – 09:48 Aaron Wimberly 3 yd run, Cole Netten XP good (Tied 7–7)
- ISU – 01:35 Aaron Wimberly 5 yd pass from Sam B. Richardson, Cole Netten XP good (ISU 14–7)

Second quarter

- ISU – 11:57 Tad Ecby 29 yd pass from Sam B. Richardson, Cole Netten XP good (ISU 21–7)
- WVU – 10:01 Mario Alford 29 yd pass from Skyler Howard, Josh Lambert XP good (ISU 21–14)
- WVU – 07:27 Mario Alford 4 yd pass from Skyler Howard, Josh Lambert XP good (Tied 21–21)
- WVU – 04:39 Josh Lambert 46 yd field goal good (WVU 24–21)
- WVU – 00:00 Josh Lambert 32 yd field goal good (WVU 27–21)

Third quarter

- ISU – 09:00 Cole Netten 34 yd field goal good (WVU 27–24)

Fourth quarter

- WVU – 09:10 Daikiel Shorts 15 yd pass from Skyler Howard, Josh Lambert XP good (WVU 34–24)
- WVU – 05:35 Josh Lambert 43 yd field goal good (WVU 37–24)

Top Passers

- WVU – Skyler Howard 21/40, 285 yards, 3 TD
- ISU – Sam B. Richardson 26/50, 275 yards, 2 TD, 2 INT

Top Rushers

- WVU – Rushel Shell 22 attempts, 146 yards, 1 TD
- ISU – Aaron Wimberly 22 attempts, 77 yards, 1 TD

Top Receiving

- WVU – Mario Alford 5 receptions, 86 yards, 2 TD
- ISU – D'Vario Montgomery 5 receptions, 71 yards

Top Tacklers

- WVU – Wes Tonkery 12 tackles
- ISU – Brian Mills 9 tackles

=== Game 12: at TCU Horned Frogs ===
Game Twelve: Iowa State Cyclones at TCU Horned Frogs – Game summary

Quarter	1	2	3	4	Total
Cyclones	0	3	0	0	3
Horned Frogs	14	3	31	7	55

at Amon G. Carter Stadium, Fort Worth, TX

- Date: December 6
- Game time: 11:05 a.m. CST
- Game weather: Temperature: 61° • Wind: N 12 • Weather: Partly Cloudy
- Game attendance: 45,242
- Referee: Referee: Greg Burks • Umpire: Scott Campbell • Linesman: George Gusman • Line judge: Jerod Phillips • Back judge: Terry White • Field judge: Nick Lave • Side judge: Shane Standley
- TV announcers (ABC): Dave Pasch (Play-by-play), Brian Griese (Color) & Tom Luginbill (Sideline)

Game information

First quarter

- TCU – 09:30 Trevone Boykin 55 yd pass from David Porter, Jaden Oberkrom XP good (TCU 7–0)
- TCU – 03:18 Aaron Green 3 yd run, Jaden Oberkrom XP good (TCU 14–0)

Second quarter

- ISU – 12:47 Cole Netten 26 yd field goal good (TCU 14–3)
- TCU – 07:57 Jaden Oberkrom 39 yd field goal good (TCU 17–3)

Third quarter

- TCU – 13:56 Aaron Green 54 yd pass from Trevone Boykin, Jaden Oberkrom XP good (TCU 24–3)
- TCU – 08:36 Jaden Oberkrom 23 yd field goal good (TCU 27–3)
- TCU – 06:41 Derrick Kindred 74 yd interception return, Jaden Oberkrom XP good (TCU 34–3)
- TCU – 01:42 Josh Doctson 18 yd pass from Trevone Boykin, Jaden Oberkrom XP good (TCU 41–3)
- TCU – 00:42 Deante' Green 45 yd pass from Trevone Boykin, Jaden Oberkrom XP good (TCU 48–3)

Fourth quarter

- TCU – 12:34 Ja'Juan Story 14 yd pass from Trevone Boykin, Jaden Oberkrom XP good (TCU 55–3)

Top Passers

- ISU – Sam B. Richardson 16/40, 152 yards, 1 INT
- TCU – Trevone Boykin 30/41, 460 yards, 4 TD, 1 INT

Top Rushers

- ISU – Aaron Wimberly 17 attempts, 73 yards
- TCU – Aaron Green 13 attempts, 104 yards, 1 TD

Top Receiving

- ISU – Jarvis West 5 receptions, 63 yards
- TCU – Josh Doctson 9 receptions, 151 yards, 1 TD

Top Tacklers

- ISU – Kane Seeley 9 tackles
- TCU – Paul Dawson 13 tackles

== Personnel ==
=== Coaching staff ===
Name	Position	Seasons at Iowa State	Alma mater
Paul Rhoads	Head coach	6th	Missouri Western (1989)
Mark Mangino	Offensive coordinator/tight ends	1st	Youngstown State (1987)
Brandon Blaney	Offensive line	1st	Youngstown State (1999)
Todd Sturdy	Quarterbacks	4th	St. Ambrose (1990)
Tommy Mangino	Wide receivers	1st	Washburn (2008)
Louis Ayeni	Running backs	1st	Northwestern (2003)
Wally Burnham	Defensive coordinator/linebackers	6th	Samford (1963)
Stan Eggen	Defensive ends	1st	Morehead State (1977)
Maurice Linguist	Defensive backs	1st	Baylor (2006)
Shane Burnham	Defensive tackles	6th	Pittsburgh (1998)
