= Dwayne Crutchfield =

American football player (born 1959)

No. 45
- Position: Running back

Personal information
- Born: September 30, 1959 (age 67); Cincinnati, Ohio, U.S.
- Listed height: 6 ft 0 in (1.83 m)
- Listed weight: 235 lb (107 kg)

Career information
- High school: North College Hill (North College Hill, Ohio)
- College: Iowa State
- NFL draft: 1982: 3rd round, 79th overall pick

Career history
- New York Jets (1982–1983); Houston Oilers (1983); Los Angeles Rams (1984); Miami Dolphins (1985)*; Houston Oilers (1985)*
- * Offseason or practice squad member only

Awards and highlights
- Second-team All-American (1980); 2× First-team All-Big Eight (1980, 1981)

Career NFL statistics
- Rushing yards: 993
- Rushing average: 4.2
- Rushing touchdowns: 5
- Stats at Pro Football Reference

Dwayne Crutchfield (born September 30, 1959) is an American former professional football player who was a running back for the New York Jets, Houston Oilers, and Los Angeles Rams of the National Football League (NFL). He played college football for the Iowa State Cyclones. Crutchfield was selected by the Jets in the third round of the 1982 NFL draft with the 79th overall pick. Throughout the course of his career, he rushed 235 times for 993 yards and 5 touchdowns.
