= Joe Meyers (American football) =

American football player and coach (1871–1959)

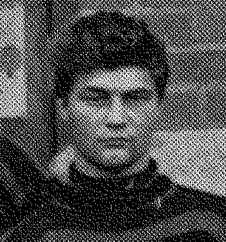
- Meyers pictured in the 1895 Iowa State team photo in the Bomb 1895 yearbook

Biographical details
- Born: December 5, 1871; North Washington, Iowa, U.S.
- Died: April 11, 1959 (aged 87); San Diego County, California, U.S.

Playing career
- 1895: Iowa Agricultural
- Position: Halfback

Coaching career (HC unless noted)
- 1899: Iowa State

Head coaching record
- Overall: 5–4–1

Joseph Henry Meyers (December 5, 1871 – April 11, 1959) was an American college football coach who was the fifth head coach for the Iowa State Cyclones. He held that position for the 1899 season. His career coaching record at Iowa State University, located in Ames, Iowa, was 5 wins, 4 losses and 1 tie. This ranks him 20th at Iowa State in total wins and sixth in winning percentage. He was an alumnus of Iowa State College (class of 1895), lettering in football in 1895. He played halfback. Meyers married Cecilia Wolfe in 1899. His wife had predeceased him in 1910.
