= Bert German =

American football player and coach (1873–1956)

Burt German
Biographical details
- Born: April 19, 1873; Maquoketa, Iowa, U.S.
- Died: September 13, 1956 (aged 83); Des Moines, Iowa, U.S.

Playing career
- 1894–1895: Iowa Agricultural
- Position: Halfback

Coaching career (HC unless noted)
- 1894–1898: Iowa Agricultural/State

Head coaching record
- Overall: 22–10

Bert German (April 19, 1873 – September 13, 1956) was an American college football player and coach. He was the third head football coach for the Iowa State University in Ames, Iowa, serving for five seasons, from 1894 to 1898, and compiling a record of 22–10.

German later worked as a real estate agent in Des Moines, Iowa. He died in 1956 at a Des Moines nursing home after suffering a stroke a year earlier.

== Head coaching record ==
Year	Team	Overall	Conference	Standing	Bowl/playoffs
Iowa Agricultural/State Cardinals/Cyclones (Independent) (1894–1898)
1894	Iowa Agricultural	5–1			
1895	Iowa Agricultural	3–4			
1896	Iowa Agricultural	8–2			
1897	Iowa Agricultural	3–1			
1898	Iowa State	3–2			
Iowa Agricultural/State:		22–10			
Total:		22–10			
