= List of Iowa State Cyclones in the NFL draft =

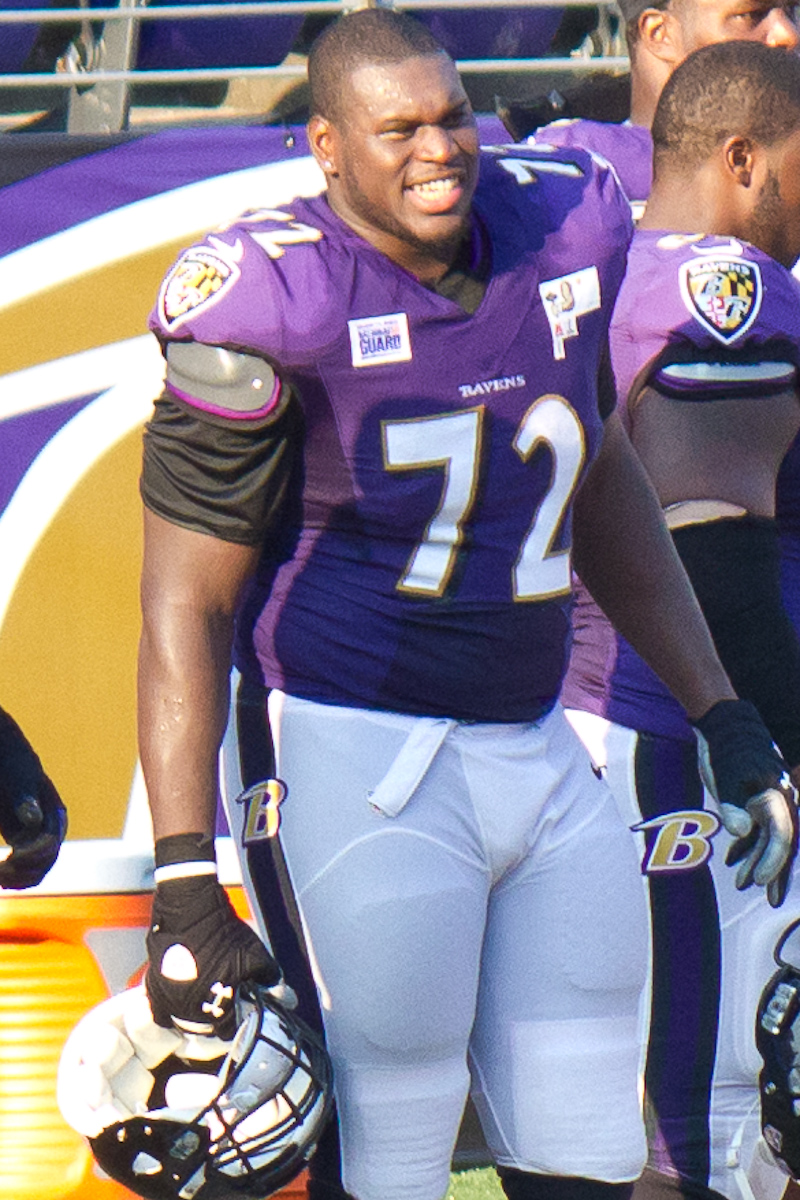
Kelechi Osemele was drafted 60th overall by the Baltimore Ravens in the 2012 NFL draft.

The Iowa State Cyclones college football team competes as part of the National Collegiate Athletic Association (NCAA) Division I Football Bowl Subdivision (FBS), and represents Iowa State University in the Big 12 Conference (Big 12). ISU has had 144 players drafted into the National Football League (NFL), since the first draft in 1936, through the 2026 NFL draft. ISU has only seen two players taken in the first round: George Amundson with the 14th overall pick in the 1973 NFL draft by the Houston Oilers, and Will McDonald IV with the 15th overall pick in the 2023 NFL draft by the New York Jets. Troy Davis was drafted in the third round of the 1997 NFL draft by the New Orleans Saints; he has since been inducted into the College Football Hall of Fame. Kelechi Osemele was drafted in the second round of the 2012 NFL draft by the Baltimore Ravens; he went on to win Super Bowl XLVII with the Ravens as their starting right tackle. Six former Cyclones who were drafted have been selected to a Pro Bowl or AFL All-Star Game.

Through the annual NFL draft, each NFL franchise gets the chance to add new players to their teams. The current draft rules were established in 2009. The team with the worst record the previous year gets to pick first, then the next-worst team picks second, and so on. Teams that were not in the playoffs receive their draft order by their regular-season record. If 2 or more non-playoff teams have the same record, the tie breaker used is their strength of schedule. Playoff teams receive their draft order after all the non-playoff teams, based on their round of elimination (wild card, division, conference, and Super Bowl).

In 1944, the All-America Football Conference was established and it began play in 1946 in direct competition with the NFL. From 1946 to 1949, the two leagues fiercely competed for the top college football prospects with each league holding their own drafts, before the AAFC finally merged with the NFL at the end of the 1949 season.

Like the AAFC earlier, the American Football League (AFL) operated in direct competition with the NFL and held a separate draft. This led to a massive bidding war over top prospects between the two leagues. As part of the merger agreement on June 8, 1966, the two leagues would hold a multiple round "common draft". Once the AFL officially merged with the NFL in 1970, the common draft simply became the NFL draft.

== Key ==
B	Back	K	Kicker	NT	Nose tackle
C	Center	LB	Linebacker	FB	Fullback
DB	Defensive back	P	Punter	HB	Halfback
DE	Defensive end	QB	Quarterback	WR	Wide receiver
DT	Defensive tackle	RB	Running back	G	Guard
E	End	T	Offensive tackle	TE	Tight end

*	Selected to a Pro Bowl or AFL All-Star Game
†	Won an NFL championship
‡	Selected to a Pro Bowl or AFL All-Star Game and won an NFL championship

== Selections ==
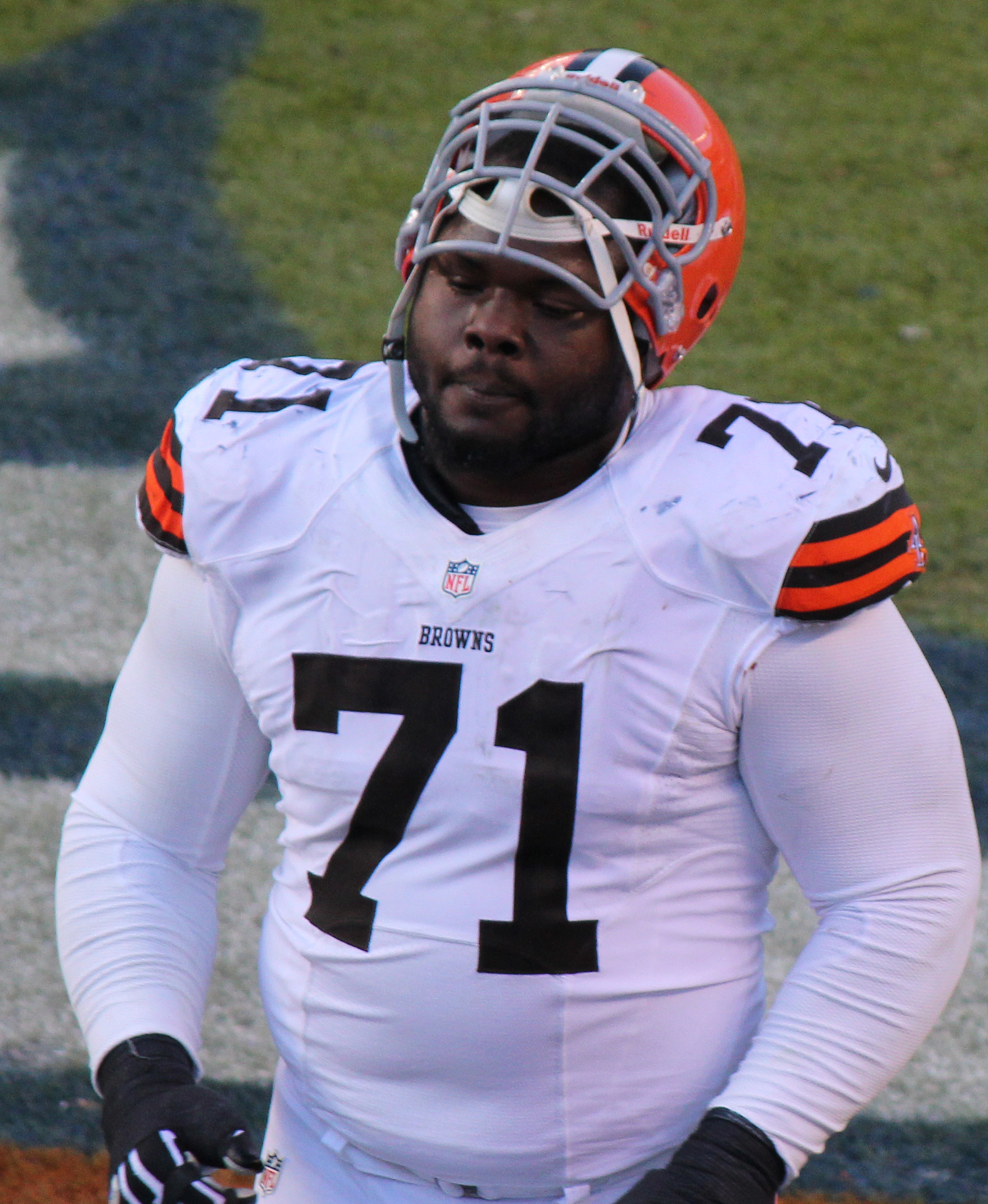
Ahtyba Rubin was drafted in the 6th round of the 2008 NFL draft by the Cleveland Browns

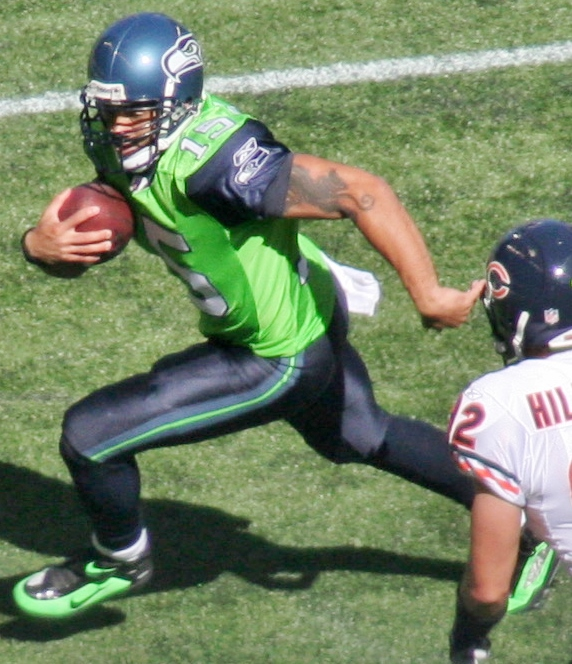
Seneca Wallace was drafted in the 4th round of the 2003 NFL draft by the Seattle Seahawks

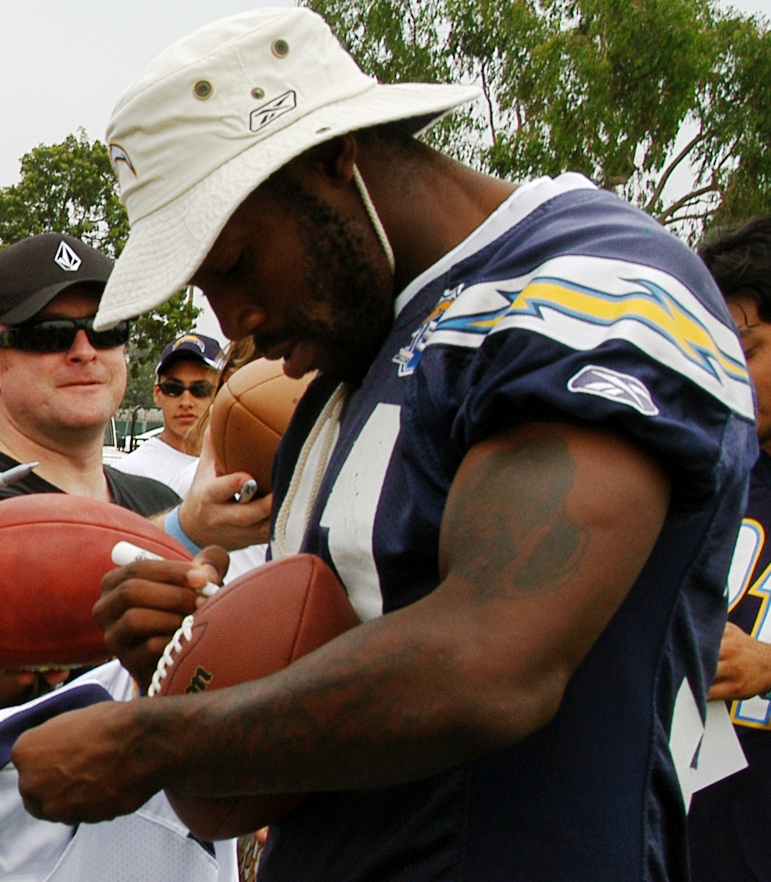
Tim Dobbins was drafted in the 5th round of the 2006 NFL draft by the San Diego Chargers

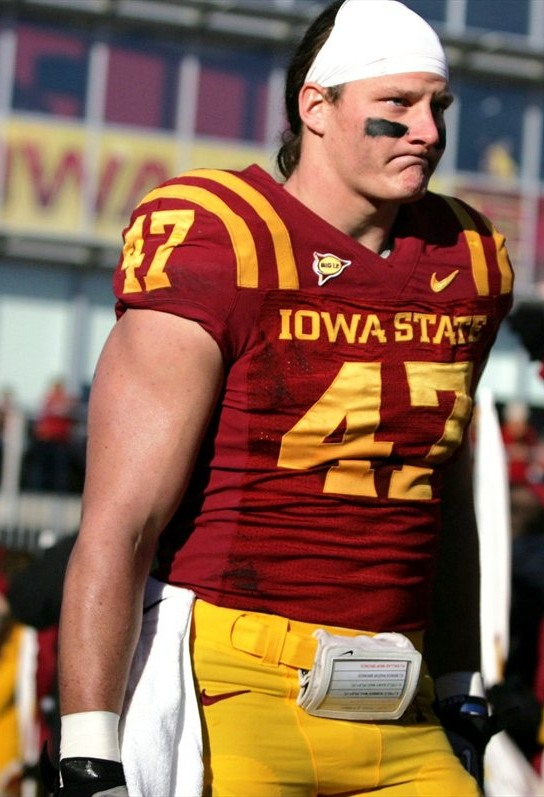
A. J. Klein was drafted in the 5th round of the 2013 NFL draft by the Carolina Panthers

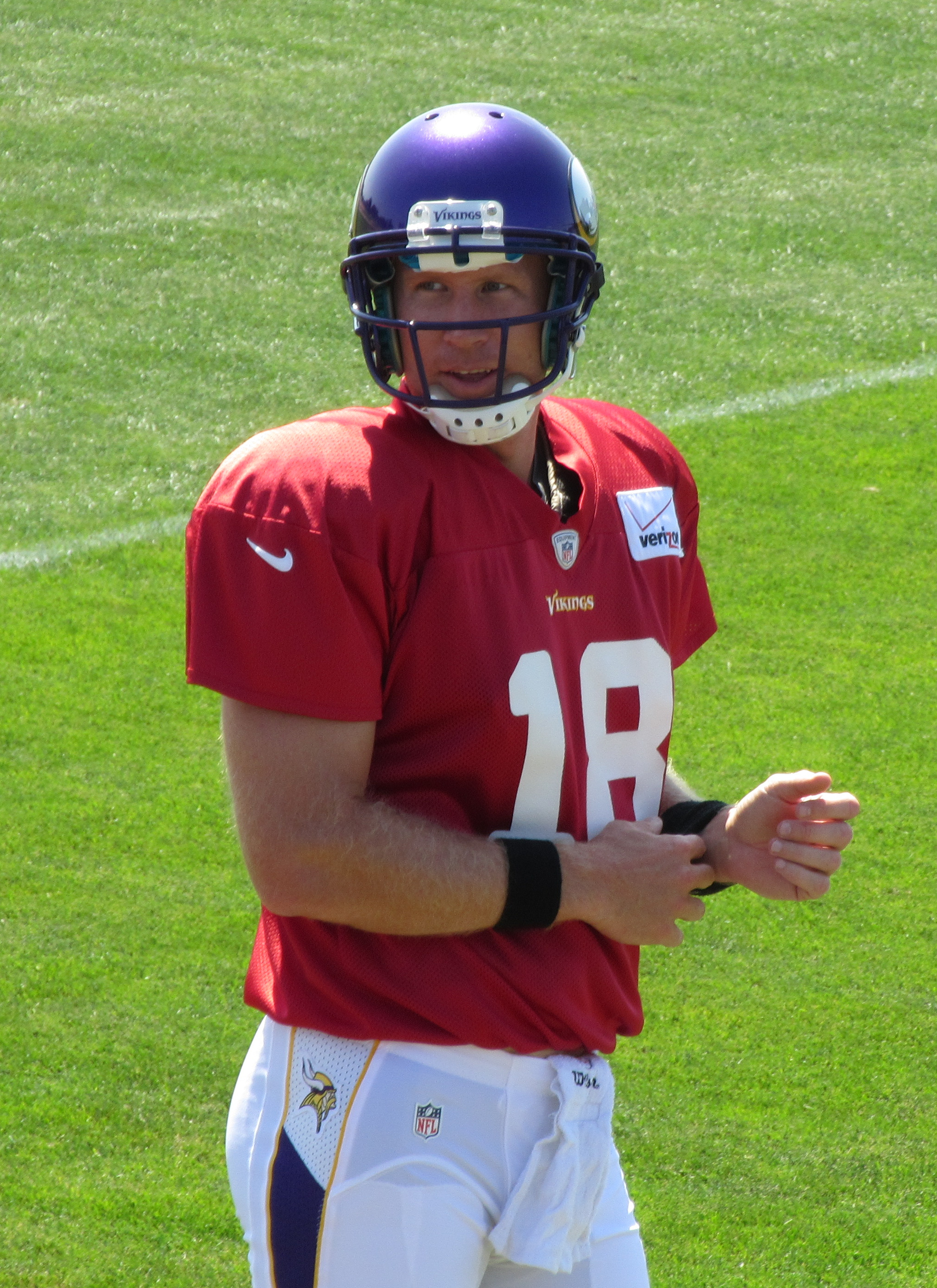
Sage Rosenfels was drafted in the 4th round of the 2001 NFL draft by the Washington Redskins

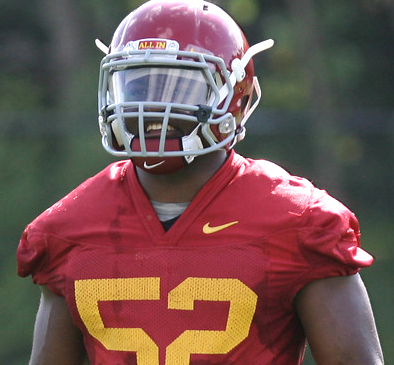
Jeremiah George was drafted in the 5th round of the 2014 NFL draft by the New York Jets

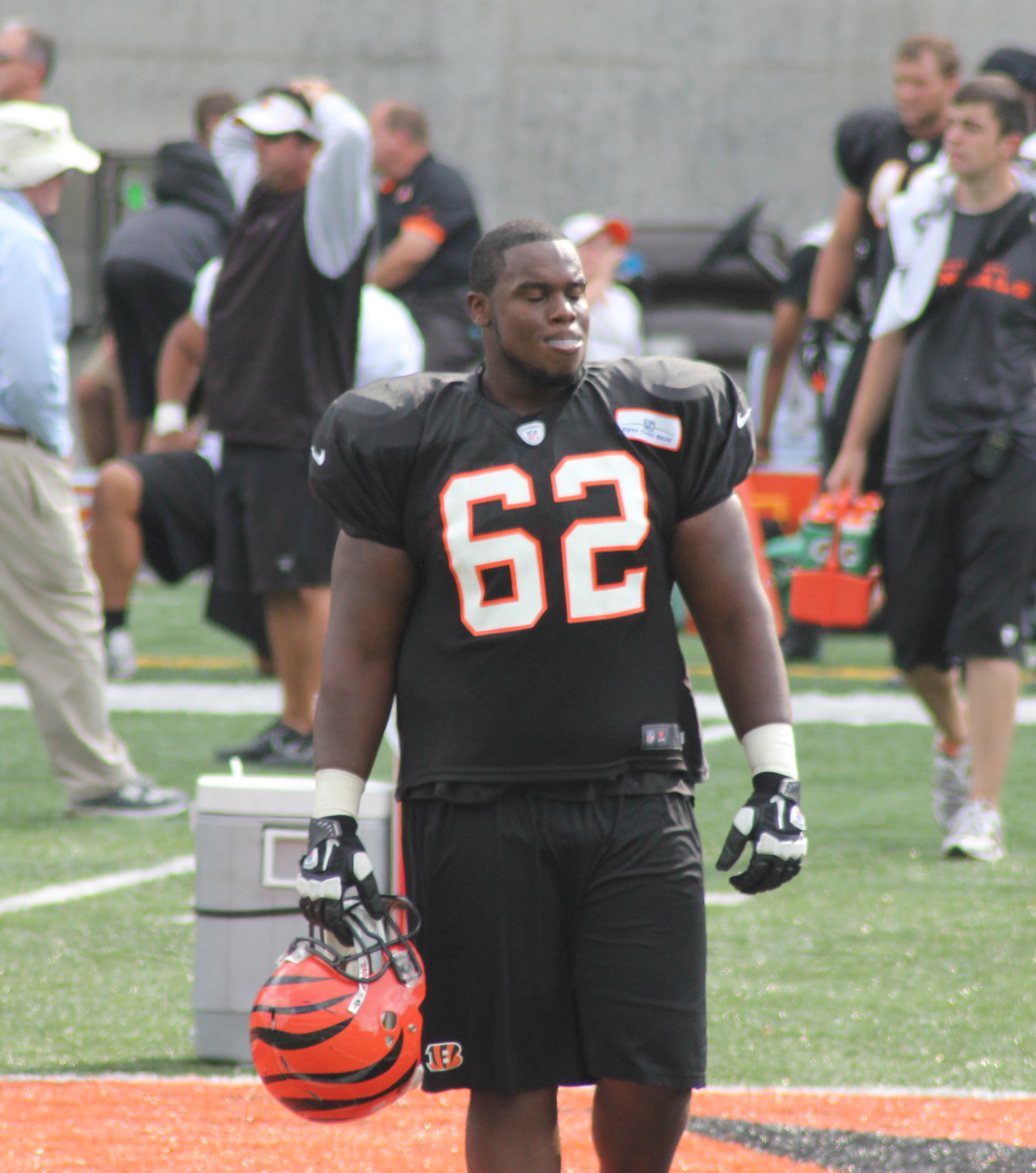
Reggie Stephens was drafted in the 7th round of the 2010 NFL draft by the Cincinnati Bengals

Year (Note: From 1960 through 1966, teams with a superscript AFL denotes a player drafted in the AFL draft and teams with a superscript NFL denotes a player drafted in the NFL draft.) (Note: From 1946 through 1949, teams with a superscript AAFC denotes a player drafted in the All-America Football Conference and teams with a superscript NFL denotes a player drafted in the NFL draft.)	Round	Pick	Overall	Player	Team (Note: This is the team that drafted the player, not their most recent team.)	Position	Notes
1939	7	6	56	Charles Heileman	Chicago Bears	E	—
1939	13	6	116	Ed Bock	Chicago Bears	G	
1939	16	3	143	Gordon Reupke	Cleveland Rams	B	—
1939	17	8	158	Clyde Shugart^{‡}	Washington Redskins	G	Pro Bowl (1941, 1942); All-Pro (1943); NFL Champion (1942)
1939	18	5	165	Paul Morin	Brooklyn Dodgers	T	—
1939	22	1	196	Everett Kircher	Chicago Bears	B	—
1941	8	10	70	Henry Wilder	Washington Redskins	B	—
1943	16	2	142	Paul Darling	Philadelphia Eagles	B	—
1943	21	1	191	Royal (Ace) Lohry	Detroit Lions	B	—
1944	25	9	261	Howard Tippe	Card-Pitt	B	—
1945	24	7	248	Charley Wright	Chicago Bears	G	—
1947	12	1	96	LaVerne Camarata	Detroit Lions	B	—
1948	13	4	109	Bob Jensen	Boston Yanks	DE	—
1949	19	9	190	Dean Laun	Chicago Cardinals	E	—
1950	12	5	149	Bill Chauncey	Washington Redskins	B	—
1950	20	7	255	Webb Halbert	Chicago Cardinals	B	—
1950	21	9	270	Bob Angle	Chicago Bears	B	—
1951	5	5	55	Jim Doran^{‡}	Detroit Lions	E	Pro Bowl (1960); NFL Champion (1952), (1953), and (1957)
1951	10	3	113	Bob Jensen	Washington Redskins	E	–
1951	18	6	213	Bill Weeks	Philadelphia Eagles	B	—
1952	15	4	173	Malcolm Schmidt	Philadelphia Eagles	E	—
1952	18	8	213	Stan Campbell^{†}	Detroit Lions	G	NFL Champion (1952), (1957), and (1960)
1952	23	4	269	Maury Schnell	Philadelphia Eagles	B	—
1953	19	5	222	Bill Byrus	Chicago Bears	T	—
1953	20	7	236	Rollie Arns	Philadelphia Eagles	C	—
1955	28	11	337	Herb McDermott	Detroit Lions	T	—
1956	28	12	337	Ollie Sparks	Cleveland Browns	G	—
1957	26	10	311	Chuck Muelhaupt	Detroit Lions	G	—
1958	15	10	179	John Scheldrup	Detroit Lions	E	—
1958	21	11	252	Bill Martin	Cleveland Browns	E	—
1959	22	10	262	Gale Gibson	New York Giants	E	—
1960	15	9	177	Tom Watkins	Cleveland Browns	B	—
1961	8	4	57	Tom Watkins	Oakland Raiders^{AFL}	B	—
1961	20	2	268	Jerry Morgan	Dallas Cowboys	B	—
1961	21	1	161	Jim Morgan	Denver Broncos^{AFL}	B	—
1961	24	2	186	Don Webb^{*}	Boston Patriots^{AFL}	DB	AFL All-Star Game (1969); All-Pro (1967)
1963	4	13	55	Chuck Walton	Detroit Lions	G	—
1963	7	3	87	Dave Hoppmann	New York Giants	B	—
1963	13	2	98	Chuck Walton	San Diego Chargers^{AFL}	G	—
1964	17	3	227	Ozzie Clay	Washington Redskins	WR	—
1964	18	10	248	Dave Hoover	St. Louis Cardinals	B	—
1965	5	1	57	Tom Vaughn	Detroit Lions	DB	—
1965	11	1	81	Tom Vaughn	Denver Broncos^{AFL}	DB	—
1965	12	4	92	John Berrington	New York Jets^{AFL}	LB	—
1965	12	5	93	Mike Cox	Kansas City Chiefs^{AFL}	LB	—
1965	19	6	258	Roosevelt Ellerbe	Washington Redskins	B	—
1966	6	8	88	Tim Van Galder	St. Louis Cardinals	QB	—
1966	16	8	238	Dick Kasperek	St. Louis Cardinals	C	—
1967	3	3	56	Larry Carwell	Houston Oilers	DB	—
1967	3	19	72	Eppie Barney	Cleveland Browns	WR	—
1967	7	7	166	Ted Tuinstra	Detroit Lions	T	—
1967	10	3	240	Dick Schafroth	Atlanta Falcons	T	—
1968	10	8	254	Doug Robinson	New Orleans Saints	DB	—
1968	10	13	259	Tom Busch	St. Louis Cardinals	WR	—
1968	14	1	355	Les Webster	Cincinnati Bengals	RB	—
1969	11	15	275	Sam Campbell	Chicago Bears	DT	—
1971	2	21	47	Otto Stowe^{†}	Miami Dolphins	WR	Super Bowl champion (VII)
1971	9	23	231	Therman Couch	San Francisco 49ers	LB	—
1971	13	17	329	Jeff Allen	St. Louis Cardinals	DB	—
1971	14	22	360	Tom Lorenz	Detroit Lions	TE	—
1971	16	16	406	Darrell Jansonius	Kansas City Chiefs	G	—
1972	7	23	179	Dean Carlson	Kansas City Chiefs	QB	—
1973	1	14	14	George Amundson	Houston Oilers	RB	—
1973	5	26	130	Dave McCurry	Miami Dolphins	DB	—
1973	7	14	170	Tommy Campbell	Atlanta Falcons	DB	—
1973	11	14	274	Geary Murdock	Minnesota Vikings	G	—
1973	14	6	344	Merv Krakau	Buffalo Bills	LB	—
1974	2	25	51	Matt Blair^{*}	Minnesota Vikings	LB	Pro Bowl (1977, 1978, 1979, 1980, 1981, 1982); All-Pro (1980)
1974	4	13	91	Ike Harris	St. Louis Cardinals	WR	—
1974	5	11	115	Keith Krepfle^{*}	Philadelphia Eagles	TE	All-Pro (1979)
1974	13	23	335	Ted Jornov	Cincinnati Bengals	LB	—
1974	15	17	381	Willie Jones	Atlanta Falcons	WR	—
1974	15	23	387	Larry Hunt	Pittsburgh Steelers	DT	—
1975	5	23	127	Barry Hill	Miami Dolphins	DB	—
1975	9	8	216	Mike Strachan	New Orleans Saints	RB	—
1975	12	2	288	Brad Storm	Baltimore Colts	LB	—
1975	12	14	300	Andre Roundtree	Detroit Lions	LB	—
1975	16	24	141	Tom Goedjen	Minnesota Vikings	K	—
1976	9	2	239	Bob Bos	Seattle Seahawks	T	—
1976	11	15	306	Greg Pittman	Denver Broncos	LB	—
1976	11	18	309	Forry Smith	Buffalo Bills	WR	—
1976	12	20	338	Randy Young	Miami Dolphins	T	—
1977	4	12	96	Luther Blue	Detroit Lions	WR	—
1977	7	11	178	Al Dixon	New York Giants	TE	—
1977	8	16	211	Otis Rodgers	New York Giants	LB	—
1977	12	13	320	Dave Greenwood	Detroit Lions	G	—
1978	7	28	194	Tom Randall	Dallas Cowboys	G	—
1979	2	3	31	Mike Stensrud	Houston Oilers	DT	—
1981	7	3	169	Kenny Neil	New York Jets	DE	—
1982	3	24	79	Dwayne Crutchfield	New York Jets	RB	—
1982	7	3	170	Dan Johnson	Miami Dolphins	TE	—
1983	3	14	70	Karl Nelson^{†}	New York Giants	T	Super Bowl champion (XXI)
1984	6	2	142	Chris Washington	Tampa Bay Buccaneers	LB	—
1984	8	8	204	Bruce Reimers	Cincinnati Bengals	G	—
1984	11	8	288	Dan Martin	New York Jets	T	—
1985	5	20	132	Tracy Henderson	New York Giants	WR	—
1986	9	20	241	Jim Luebbers	New York Giants	DE	—
1987	8	8	203	Dennis Gibson	Detroit Lions	LB	—
1987	9	13	236	Terrence Anthony	Atlanta Falcons	DB	—
1987	12	14	321	Bill Berthusen	New York Giants	DT	—
1989	10	22	273	Joe Henderson	New Orleans Saints	RB	—
1990	2	14	39	Keith Sims^{*}	Miami Dolphins	G	Pro Bowl (1993, 1994, 1995); All-Pro (1994) and (1995)
1990	10	6	254	Mike Busch	Tampa Bay Buccaneers	TE	—
1991	4	19	102	Marcus Robertson^{*}	Houston Oilers	DB	All-Pro (1993)
1991	5	10	121	Gene Williams	Miami Dolphins	G	—
1991	6	9	148	Blaise Bryant	New York Jets	RB	—
1997	3	2	62	Troy Davis	New Orleans Saints	RB	
1997	3	25	85	Tim Kohn	Oakland Raiders	T	—
1998	5	15	138	Oliver Ross	Dallas Cowboys	T	—
2001	3	25	87	Reggie Hayward	Denver Broncos	DE	—
2001	4	14	109	Sage Rosenfels	Washington Redskins	QB	—
2001	7	6	206	James Reed	New York Jets	DT	—
2002	7	12	223	Mike Banks	Arizona Cardinals	TE	—
2003	4	13	110	Seneca Wallace	Seattle Seahawks	QB	—
2005	3	20	84	Ellis Hobbs	New England Patriots	DB	—
2006	5	19	151	Tim Dobbins	San Diego Chargers	LB	—
2007	7	31	241	Aaron Brant	Chicago Bears	G	—
2008	5	12	147	Alvin Bowen	Buffalo Bills	LB	—
2008	6	24	190	Ahtyba Rubin	Cleveland Browns	DT	—
2010	7	21	228	Reggie Stephens	Cincinnati Bengals	C	—
2012	2	28	60	Kelechi Osemele^{†}	Baltimore Ravens	T	Pro Bowl (2016, 2017); Super Bowl champion (XLVII)
2013	5	15	148	A. J. Klein	Carolina Panthers	LB	—
2013	7	40	246	Carter Bykowski	San Francisco 49ers	T	—
2014	5	14	154	Jeremiah George	New York Jets	LB	—
2019	3	9	73	David Montgomery	Chicago Bears	RB	—
2019	4	1	103	Hakeem Butler	Arizona Cardinals	WR	—
2021	4	14	119	Kene Nwangwu	Minnesota Vikings	RB	—
2022	2	4	36	Breece Hall	New York Jets	RB	—
2022	4	11	116	Eyioma Uwazurike	Denver Broncos	DT	
2022	4	23	128	Charlie Kolar	Baltimore Ravens	TE	
2022	7	41	262	Brock Purdy	San Francisco 49ers	QB	Pro Bowl (2023)
2023	1	15	15	Will McDonald IV	New York Jets	DE	
2023	6	28	205	Xavier Hutchinson	Houston Texans	WR	
2023	7	25	242	Anthony Johnson Jr.	Green Bay Packers	DB	
2024	4	30	130	T. J. Tampa	Baltimore Ravens	DB	
2025	2	2	34	Jayden Higgins	Houston Texans	WR	
2025	3	4	68	Darien Porter	Las Vegas Raiders	CB	
2025	3	15	79	Jaylin Noel	Houston Texans	WR	
2025	4	25	127	Jalen Travis	Indianapolis Colts	OT	
2026	3	18	82	Domonique Orange	Minnesota Vikings	DT	

== Notable undrafted players ==
Note: No drafts held before 1920

Debut year	Player name	Debut NFL/AFL team	Position	Notes
1964	Dick Limerick	Detroit Lions	WR	—
1965	Eli Strand	Green Bay Packers	G	—
1968	Tony Baker	New Orleans Saints	RB	—
1979	Buddy Hardeman	Washington Redskins	RB	—
1979	Tony Norman	Minnesota Vikings	DE	—
1980	Michael Schwartz	Pittsburgh Steelers	DB	—
1984	David Archer	Atlanta Falcons	QB	—
1985	Kevin Williams	Washington Redskins	DB	—
1987	Alex Espinoza	Kansas City Chiefs	QB	—
1987	Vince Jasper	New York Jets	G	—
1987	Greg Liter	Philadelphia Eagles	DE	—
1987	Aaron Manning	Green Bay Packers	DB	—
1996	Mike Horacek	Detroit Lions	WR	—
1998	Todd Doxzon	Miami Dolphins	WR	—
1999	Jamie Kohl	Seattle Seahawks	K	—
2001	J. J. Moses	Kansas City Chiefs	WR	—
2002	Kevin DeRonde	Dallas Cowboys	DE	—
2003	Jeremy Loyd	St. Louis Rams	LB	—
2004	Jordan Carstens	Carolina Panthers	DT	—
2005	Tyson Smith	Baltimore Ravens	LB	—
2006	Tony Yelk	Atlanta Falcons	K	—
2007	LaMarcus Hicks	Detroit Lions	CB	—
2008	Ben Barkema	Cleveland Browns	TE	—
2008	Todd Blythe	New Orleans Saints	WR	—
2011	Collin Franklin	New York Jets	TE	—
2011	David Sims	New York Giants	S	—
2012	Hayworth Hicks	Indianapolis Colts	G	—
2012	Leonard Johnson	Tampa Bay Buccaneers	CB	—
2012	Darius Reynolds	Green Bay Packers	WR	—
2013	Jake Knott	Philadelphia Eagles	LB	—
2013	Josh Lenz	Chicago Bears	WR	—
2013	Jake McDonough	New York Jets	DE	—
2015	E. J. Bibbs	Cleveland Browns	TE	—
2015	Ernst Brun Jr.	Washington Redskins	TE	—
2015	Tom Farniok	Minnesota Vikings	C	—
2015	David Irving	Dallas Cowboys	DE	—
2017	Jamal Perry	Philadelphia Eagles	CB	—
2017	Jhaustin Thomas	Indianapolis Colts	DL	—
2018	Jake Campos	Dallas Cowboys	T	—
2018	Joel Lanning	Dallas Cowboys	LB	—
2018	Allen Lazard	Jacksonville Jaguars	WR	—
2019	Matthew Eaton	Green Bay Packers	WR	—
2019	Willie Harvey Jr.	Cleveland Browns	LB	—
2020	Julian Good-Jones	Philadelphia Eagles	G	—
2020	Matt Leo	Philadelphia Eagles	DE	—
2020	Steven Wirtel	Detroit Lions	LS	—
2021	Landen Akers	Los Angeles Rams	WR	—
2021	JaQuan Bailey	Philadelphia Eagles	DE	—
2021	Dylan Soehner	New Orleans Saints	TE	—
2022	Chase Allen	Chicago Bears	TE	—
2022	Jake Hummel	Los Angeles Rams	LB	—
2022	Andrew Mevis	Jacksonville Jaguars	K	—
2022	Mike Rose	Kansas City Chiefs	LB	—
2023	M. J. Anderson	Seattle Seahawks	DE	—
2024	Ben Nikkel	Washington Commanders	S	—
2024	Dimitri Stanley	Green Bay Packers	WR	—
2025	Jarrod Hufford	Las Vegas Raiders	OL	—
2025	Stevo Klotz	Los Angeles Chargers	TE	—
2025	Myles Purchase	Los Angeles Chargers	CB	—
2025	J. R. Singleton	Seattle Seahawks	DL	—
2025	Malik Verdon	Atlanta Falcons	LB	—
2026	Dylan Barrett	Green Bay Packers	G	—
2026	Jim Bonifas	Miami Dolphins	C	—
2026	Tyler Miller	Denver Broncos	OT	—
2026	James Neal III	Houston Texans	OL	—

== See also ==
- List of Iowa State University people
