= Clyde Shugart =

American football player (1916–2009)

No. 51
- Positions: Guard, tackle

Personal information
- Born: December 7, 1916; Elberon, Iowa, U.S.
- Died: July 2, 2009 (aged 92); Gulf Breeze, Florida, U.S.
- Listed height: 6 ft 1 in (1.85 m)
- Listed weight: 221 lb (100 kg)

Career information
- High school: Ames (IA)
- College: Iowa State (1935-1938)
- NFL draft: 1939: 17th round, 158th overall pick

Career history
- Washington Redskins (1939–1944)

Awards and highlights
- NFL champion (1942); 2× Pro Bowl (1941, 1942); First-team All-Big Six (1938)

Career NFL statistics
- Games played: 56
- Interceptions: 1
- Interception yards: 8
- Stats at Pro Football Reference

Clyde Earl Shugart (December 7, 1916 – July 2, 2009) was an American professional football guard in the National Football League (NFL) for the Washington Redskins. He played college football at Iowa State University and was drafted in the seventeenth round of the 1939 NFL draft.

== Early life ==
Shugart was born in Ames, Iowa, and attended Ames High School. During his high school football career, he earned first-team all-state honors and was named as "the finest prep lineman in the state" by the Des Moines Register.

== College career ==
Shugart then attended and played college football at Iowa State University, where he was a member of one of Iowa State's best football teams in school history. During his senior season, he played right tackle with All-American guard Ed Bock on the 1938 "Cyclone Eleven" squad that produced a 7-1-1 record for coach Jim Yeager. Shugart earned all-Big Six Conference honors and received All-America board recognition, playing all but 20 minutes of the entire season. In a 1960s poll, Shugart was named the best tackle in school history.

== Professional career ==
Shugart was drafted in the fifteenth round of the 1939 NFL draft by the Washington Redskins. In 1939, the Redskins finished 8–2–1 and fell short of the Eastern Division championship. During the 1940 season, the Redskins posted a then-franchise-record nine wins and earned a trip to the 1940 NFL Championship game, where they lost to the Chicago Bears, 73–0, the most one-sided victory in NFL history. The Redskins then beat the Bears in the 1942 NFL Championship game, 14–6, before a sellout crowd of 36,000 at Griffith Stadium. The following season, the Redskins went 6–3–1 and again met the Bears in the 1943 NFL Championship game, where they lost 41–21. Shugart retired after the 1944 season after making a salary of $4,400 ($80,473 in 2025).

Shugart played his entire career for the Redskins (1939–1944) and never missed a game in his career. During this time, he was named to two Pro Bowls (1941, 1942) and was named second-team All-Pro in 1943.

== Life after football ==
After retiring from football, Shugart took a job as a manager of a High's Ice Cream branch plant in Baltimore, Maryland. He worked at High's for 47 years before retiring in 1986, and at one point owned 50 percent of the corporate stock. In 2007, he moved to Gulf Breeze, Florida, where he died from a stroke on July 2, 2009, at age 92.

== Legacy ==
In 2000, Shugart was inducted in the Iowa High School Football Hall of Fame in 2000. In 2004, he was inducted into the Iowa State Hall of Fame.
