= Ben Barkema =

American football player and coach (born 1984)

Current position
- Title: Assistant coach
- Conference: MVFC

Biographical details
- Born: October 6, 1984 (age 42); Muscatine, Iowa

Playing career
- 2004–2007: Iowa State
- 2008: Cleveland Browns*: Offseason member only
- Position: Tight end

Coaching career (HC unless noted)
- 2009–2011: Iowa State (GA)
- 2012: Upper Iowa (defensive line)
- 2013–present: Missouri State (assistant coach)

Ben Barkema (born October 6, 1984) is an American former football tight end who played for the Cleveland Browns. He played college football at Iowa State and was selected as an undrafted free agent by the Browns after the 2008 NFL draft.
