= George Amundson =

American football player (born 1951)

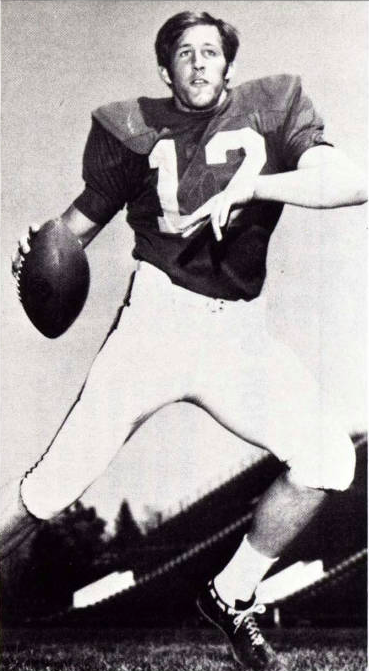
- Amundson about to throw a football at Iowa State

No. 12, 38
- Position: Running back

Personal information
- Born: March 31, 1951 (age 75); Pendleton, Oregon, U.S.
- Listed height: 6 ft 3 in (1.91 m)
- Listed weight: 215 lb (98 kg)

Career information
- High school: Central (SD)
- College: Iowa State
- NFL draft: 1973: 1st round, 14th overall pick

Career history
- Houston Oilers (1973–1974); Philadelphia Eagles (1975)

Awards and highlights
- Second-team All-American (1972); Big Eight Player of the Year (1972); First-team All-Big Eight (1972); Second-team All-Big Eight (1971); South Dakota Sports Hall of Fame; Iowa State Hall of Fame

Career NFL statistics
- Rushing yards: 194
- Average: 2.6
- Touchdowns: 5
- Stats at Pro Football Reference

George Arthur Amundson (born March 31, 1951) is an American former professional football player who was a running back in the National Football League (NFL). He was selected by the Houston Oilers in the first round of the 1973 NFL draft. He played college football for the Iowa State Cyclones, both at quarterback and running back.

He has been inducted into both the South Dakota Sports Hall of Fame and Iowa State Hall of Fame.

== Early life ==
Amundson was born in Pendleton, Oregon but grew up in Aberdeen, South Dakota. At Aberdeen Central he excelled in football, basketball, baseball, and track & field. As a high schooler Amundson set the state record in shot put and discus, the latter of which he still holds. In football he was selected to the Argus Leader all-state first-team both as a linebacker and quarterback.

== College career ==
Amundson was recruited to Iowa State both as a track & field athlete and as a football player. He would ultimately become a seven time letter winner, four in track & field and three in football.

The football field is where Amundson truly excelled and gained most of his recognition. He was recruited as a quarterback but had to play tailback his junior season due to several injuries on the team. He led the Cyclones to their first ever bowl berth in the 1971 Sun Bowl. That season he rushed for a then-record 1,260 yards and 15 touchdowns. His senior season he was able to switch back to his natural position of quarterback where he became the first Cyclone to top 2,000 yards of total offense in a season. His 2,387 yards set a Big Eight Conference mark and earned him Big Eight Player of the Year honors, beating out Nebraska's Heisman Trophy winner Johnny Rodgers.

=== Statistics ===
Season	GP	Passing							Rushing			
Season	GP	Cmp	Att	Pct	Yds	TD	Int	Rtg	Att	Yds	Avg	TD
1970	11	37	103	35.9	471	4	7	73.6	111	440	4.0	7
1971	11	11	23	47.8	256	1	1	147.0	287	1316	4.6	15
1972	12	155	332	46.7	2,110	17	22	103.7	134	508	3.8	9
Total	34	203	458	44.3	2,837	22	30	99.1	532	2,264	4.3	31

== Professional career ==
At the conclusion of his collegiate career, Amundson was drafted in the first round by the Houston Oilers with the 14th overall pick in the 1973 NFL draft. He was the only first round NFL draft pick in Iowa State history until 2023. Amundson would play the following two seasons with the Oilers and his final NFL season with the Philadelphia Eagles. His career stats are 74 rushes for 194 yards and four touchdowns, three of them coming in one game. Amundson tried out for the St. Louis Cardinals as a tight end in 1977 and 1978 but suffered a knee injury during the 1978 training camp, ending his football career. After recovering from knee surgery, he moved to Houston to work as a construction equipment salesman.
