= Ben Nikkel =

American football player (born 1999)

Profile
- Position: Safety

Personal information
- Born: September 24, 1999 (age 27); McPherson, Kansas, U.S.
- Listed height: 6 ft 1 in (1.85 m)
- Listed weight: 210 lb (95 kg)

Career information
- High school: McPherson
- College: McPherson (2018–2020); Iowa State (2021–2023)
- NFL draft: 2024: undrafted

Career history
- Washington Commanders (2024)*; Indianapolis Colts (2025)*
- * Offseason or practice squad member only
- Stats at Pro Football Reference

Ben Nikkel (born September 24, 1999) is an American professional football safety. He played college football for the McPherson Bulldogs and Iowa State Cyclones.

== Early life ==
Nikkel was born September 24, 1999 in McPherson, Kansas. He attended McPherson High School, graduating in 2018. Nikkel played on the school's football team as a wide receiver and defensive back.

== College career ==
Nikkel enrolled at McPherson College to play college football for the McPherson Bulldogs. He played wide receiver for three seasons from 2018 to 2020, recording 107 receptions for 1,570 yards and 14 touchdowns in that time. Nikkel was a team captain and a two-time all-conference selection at McPherson. He then transferred to play for the Iowa State Cyclones. He played defensive back and special teams as a walk-on at Iowa State. He redshirted in 2021 before being awarded a scholarship and being named a team captain in 2023. Nikkel played in all 12 games in 2022 and recorded three tackles; in 2023, he played in 12 games with two starts, recording 40 tackles, one tackle for loss, and three pass breakups, as well as a blocked punt recovery.

== Professional career ==
Pre-draft measurables
| Height | Weight | Arm length | Hand span | Wingspan | 40-yard dash | 10-yard split | 20-yard split | 20-yard shuttle | Three-cone drill | Vertical jump | Broad jump | Bench press |
|---|---|---|---|---|---|---|---|---|---|---|---|---|
| 6 ft 0 1/4 in (1.84 m) | 199 lb (90 kg) | 30 5/8 in (0.78 m) | 9 1/2 in (0.24 m) | 6 ft 3 3/4 in (1.92 m) | 4.45 s | 1.50 s | 2.56 s | 4.10 s | 6.82 s | 39.5 in (1.00 m) | 11 ft 4 in (3.45 m) | 15 reps |
All values from Pro Day

=== Washington Commanders ===
Nikkel was not selected in the 2024 NFL draft. He was signed to the practice squad of the Washington Commanders on October 22, 2024, and the Commanders signed him to a future contract on January 28, 2025. He was released from the Commanders on August 26.

=== Indianapolis Colts ===
The Indianapolis Colts signed Nikkel to the team's practice squad on August 28, 2025. He signed a reserve/future contract with Indianapolis on January 5, 2026.

Nikkel was waived by the Colts as a part of final roster cuts on August 30, 2026.
