= Julian Good-Jones =

American football player (born 1997)

No. 61 – Washington Commanders
- Position: Center
- Roster status: Practice squad

Personal information
- Born: March 2, 1997 (age 29); Cedar Rapids, Iowa, U.S.
- Listed height: 6 ft 5 in (1.96 m)
- Listed weight: 313 lb (142 kg)

Career information
- High school: Washington (Cedar Rapids)
- College: Iowa State (2015–2019)
- NFL draft: 2020: undrafted

Career history
- Philadelphia Eagles (2020)*; Calgary Stampeders (2021–2022); Philadelphia Eagles (2023)*; Washington Commanders (2023–present)
- * Offseason or practice squad member only

Awards and highlights
- First-team All-Big 12 (2019)

Career NFL statistics as of 2025
- Games played: 1
- Stats at Pro Football Reference

Career CFL statistics
- Games played: 22
- Games started: 22
- Stats at CFL.ca

Julian Good-Jones (born March 2, 1997) is an American professional football center for the Washington Commanders of the National Football League (NFL). He played college football for the Iowa State Cyclones and signed with the Philadelphia Eagles as an undrafted free agent in 2020. Good-Jones has also played with the Calgary Stampeders of the Canadian Football League (CFL).

== Early life ==
Good-Jones was born on March 2, 1997, in Cedar Rapids, Iowa. He attended Washington High School in Cedar Rapids and was one of the top offensive line prospects in Iowa after being named first-team all-state as a senior. He was named the co-offensive most valuable player of the district and helped his team average over 40 points and 280 yards rushing each game. Good-Jones was a three-star recruit and elected to play college football at Iowa State over offers from Indiana, Kansas State, Louisville, and Oregon State.

Good-Jones spent his first season at Iowa State, 2015, as a redshirt. The following season, he started 11 games at right tackle and helped the team average 421.6 yards of offense per game, while being named first-team academic all-conference. In 2017, he moved to center and started all 13 games, being named honorable mention all-conference.

Good-Jones made another position change in 2018, starting all but one of his 13 games at left tackle, and the other at center. He was selected honorable mention All-Big 12 for the second consecutive season. As a senior, he started 12 games at left tackle and was named first-team all-conference. He missed his team's bowl game against Notre Dame, putting an end to his 49-game consecutive start streak which lasted from the second game of his freshman season to the second-to-last game of his senior year. His streak was the longest in school history and one of the longest in FBS history. Overall, of his 49 starts at Iowa State, Good-Jones started 24 games at left tackle, 14 games at center, and 11 games at right tackle, and was named Honorable Mention All-Big 12 as a redshirt sophomore and redshirt junior, and First Team All-Big 12 as a redshirt senior.

== Professional career ==
Pre-draft measurables
| Height | Weight | Arm length | Hand span | Wingspan |
|---|---|---|---|---|
| 6 ft 4 5/8 in (1.95 m) | 313 lb (142 kg) | 32 3/4 in (0.83 m) | 9 7/8 in (0.25 m) | 6 ft 7 5/8 in (2.02 m) |
All values from Pro Day

=== Philadelphia Eagles ===
After going unselected in the 2020 NFL draft, Good-Jones was signed by the Philadelphia Eagles as an undrafted free agent. He was released during the roster cuts period.

=== Calgary Stampeders ===
In 2021, Good-Jones was signed by the Calgary Stampeders of the Canadian Football League (CFL) and appeared in seven regular season games, as well as one postseason.

Good-Jones returned to the Stampeders in 2022 and started 15 games while helping the team have the best offense in the league. The Calgary line only allowed 17 sacks while the team averaged 6.4 yards per rush and 135.3 rushing yards per game, both leading the league by a wide margin.

=== Philadelphia Eagles (second stint) ===
Shortly after the 2022 CFL season ended, Good-Jones received a tryout from the Eagles. He was granted release by Calgary in January 2023 to pursue opportunities in the NFL, and afterwards was signed by the Eagles to a future contract. He was waived on August 29, 2023 and re-signed to the practice squad.

=== Washington Commanders ===
On November 7, 2023, the Washington Commanders signed Good-Jones to their active roster off the Eagles' practice squad. He appeared in one game in the 2023 season, playing two snaps in the team's season finale against the Dallas Cowboys. Good-Jones was waived by the team on August 27, 2024, and joined their practice squad the following day.

On January 28, 2025, Good-Jones signed a reserve/future contract with the Commanders. On August 20, he was waived/injured with him landing on injured reserve the next day after going unclaimed on waivers. Good-Jones was released with an injury settlement on August 28, and re-signed to their practice squad on October 15. He was promoted to the active roster on December 31.

Good-Jones was released by the Commanders on August 30, 2026, and was re-signed to their practice squad the following day.
