= J. R. Singleton =

American football player (born 2002)

J.R. Singleton
Profile
- Position: Nose tackle

Personal information
- Born: February 13, 2002 (age 24); Gurnee, Illinois, U.S.
- Listed height: 6 ft 1 in (1.85 m)
- Listed weight: 299 lb (136 kg)

Career information
- High school: Warren Township (Gurnee, Illinois)
- College: Iowa State (2020–2024)
- NFL draft: 2025: undrafted

Career history
- Seattle Seahawks (2025–2026)*
- * Offseason or practice squad member only

Awards and highlights
- Super Bowl champion (LX)
- Stats at Pro Football Reference

J. R. Singleton (born February 13, 2002) is an American professional football nose tackle. He played college football for the Iowa State Cyclones.

== College career ==
Singleton played college football for the Iowa State Cyclones from 2020 to 2024. He played in 49 games, starting in 28, for the Cyclones, registering 75 total tackles, including 10.5 tackles for loss. Singleton also recorded 7.5 sacks, one pass deflection and three forced fumbles. In 2024, his senior season, Singleton was named an All-Big 12 Honorable Mention.

== Professional career ==
Pre-draft measurables
Height	Weight	Arm length	Hand span	Wingspan	40-yard dash	10-yard split	20-yard split	20-yard shuttle	Three-cone drill	Vertical jump	Broad jump	Bench press
6 ft 1 1/4 in (1.86 m)	299 lb (136 kg)	32 5/8 in (0.83 m)	9 5/8 in (0.24 m)	6 ft 8 1/8 in (2.04 m)	5.21 s	1.75 s	3.01 s	4.66 s	7.68 s	29.5 in (0.75 m)	9 ft 0 in (2.74 m)	26 reps
All values from Pro Day

After not being selected in the 2025 NFL draft, Singleton signed with the Seattle Seahawks as an undrafted free agent. He was released by the Seahawks on August 26, before re-signing to the practice squad the following day. On February 12, 2026, Singleton signed a reserve/futures contract with Seattle. On August 30, he was waived by the Seahawks as a part of final roster cuts.
