= Iowa State Cyclones football =

Football team of Iowa State University

| 2026 Iowa State Cyclones football team |
- First season: 1892; 134 years ago
- Athletic director: Jared Benko
- General manager: Ricky Ciccone
- Head coach: Jimmy Rogers; 1st season, 5–5 (.500)
- Location: Ames, Iowa
- Stadium: Jack Trice Stadium (capacity: 63,000)
- NCAA division: Division I FBS
- Conference: Big 12
- Colors: Cardinal and gold
- All-time record: 561–677–45 (.455)
- Bowl record: 6–13 (.316)

Conference championships
- MVIAA: 1911, 1912

Division championships
- Big 12 North (shared with Colorado): 2004
- Consensus All-Americans: 6
- Rivalries: Iowa (rivalry); Kansas State (rivalry); Missouri (rivalry); Nebraska (rivalry)

Uniforms
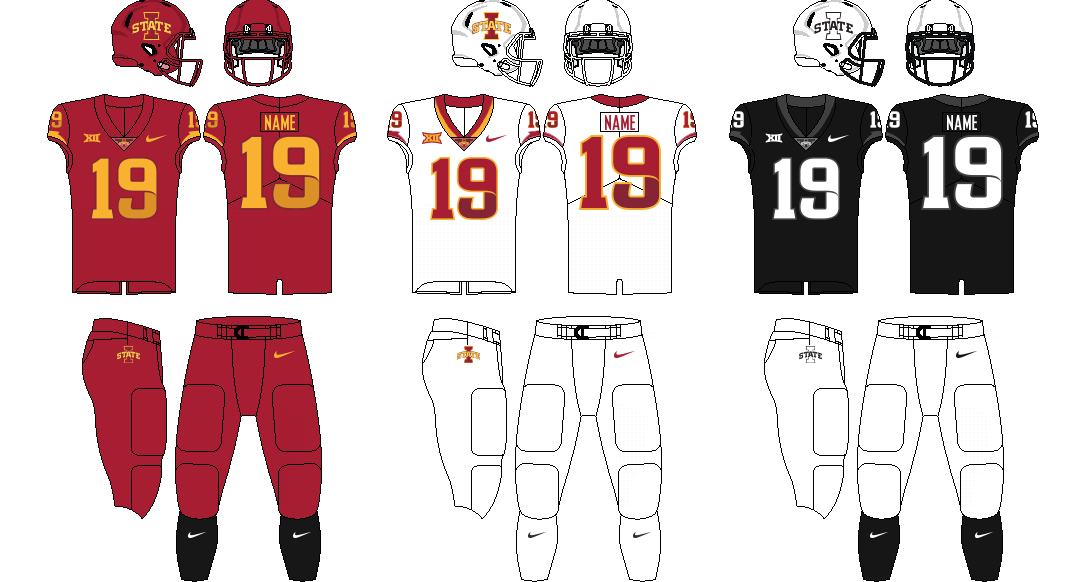
- Fight song: ISU Fights
- Marching band: "Iowa State University Cyclone Football 'Varsity' Marching Band"
- Outfitter: Nike
- Website: cyclones.com

The Iowa State Cyclones football program is the intercollegiate football team at Iowa State University in Ames, Iowa. The team is coached by Jimmy Rogers. The Cyclones compete in the Big 12 Conference, and are a Division I Football Bowl Subdivision (FBS) member of the NCAA. The Cyclones play their home games at Jack Trice Stadium, with a capacity of 61,500. The Iowa State Cyclones football team drew an average home attendance of 60,384 in 2023, the 28th highest in college football.

== History ==
=== Early history (1892–1967) ===
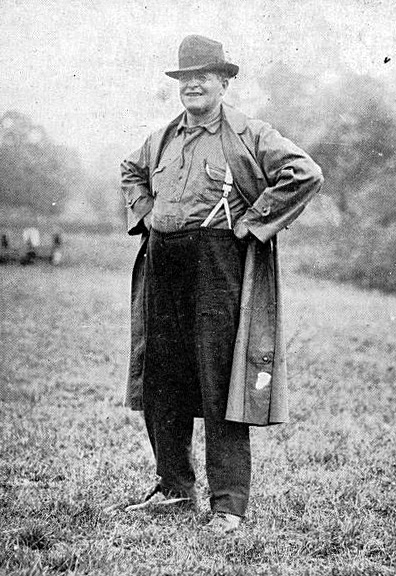
Legendary coach Pop Warner co-coached Iowa State's earliest football teams

Football first made its way onto the Iowa State campus in 1878 as a recreational sport, but it wasn't until 1892 that an organized group of athletes first represented Iowa State in football. In 1894, college president William M. Beardshear spearheaded the foundation of an athletic association to officially sanction Iowa State football teams. The 1894 team finished with a 6–1 mark, including a 16–8 victory over what is now the University of Iowa.

One of the pioneers of football, Pop Warner, spent time at Iowa State early in his career. In 1895 despite already being the coach at Georgia he was offered $25 per week to come to Iowa State, whose season started in mid-August while Georgia's started a month later, as well as to provide weekly advice during the rest of the season. Soon after Warner left for Georgia, Iowa State had its first game of the season. Iowa State came into Evanston as the underdog Iowa State then defeated Northwestern 36–0. A Chicago sportswriter called the team "cornfed giants from Iowa" while the Chicago Tribune's headline read, "Struck by a Cyclone". Since then, Iowa State teams have been known as the Cyclones. Overall, the team had three wins and three losses and, like Georgia, Iowa State retained Warner for the next season. In 1896 the team had eight wins and two losses. Despite leaving Cornell in 1898, Warner remained as the head coach of Iowa State for another year. During his last three years at Iowa State the team had a winning season but Warner was unable to match his 1896 triumph. After playing at Iowa and then serving as an assistant coach for two years, Clyde Williams came to Ames as an assistant coach for ISU. Williams served as the Cyclones' head football coach for six seasons from 1907 to 1912. During that time, he had a coaching record of 32–15–2. This ranks him fifth at Iowa State in total wins and fourth at Iowa State in winning percentage. In addition, he led Iowa State to two Missouri Valley Conference football titles in 1911 and 1912, which are the only two conference football championships in school history. In addition to his football contributions Williams was the school's first men's basketball coach from 1908 to 1911, where he compiled a 20–29 record. He also served as Iowa State's baseball coach, and was their athletic director from 1914 to 1919. In 1914 Iowa State completed construction of their new football field and it was named Clyde Williams Field in honor of the former coach. Williams was inducted into the State of Iowa Hall of Fame in 1956. He is also one of the few people inducted into both the University of Iowa Athletics Hall of Fame (inducted 1993) and the Iowa State athletics Hall of Fame (inducted 1997). The success Iowa State found in the inception of their football program was not replicated for most of the mid-20th century. In 1922 after having two different head coaches in as many years, ISU hired up-and-comer Sam Willaman away from East Technical HS in Cleveland, OH. When Willaman came to Iowa state, he brought with him six of his former East Tech players, including Jack Trice. Trice was the first African-American player at Iowa State, and one of the first African-Americans to play football in the Midwest. Trice suffered a severe malicious injury during a game at Minnesota in 1923, and died from complications. In 1997, Iowa State's Cyclone Stadium was renamed Jack Trice Stadium in his honor, becoming the first and as of 2020, the only, major college football stadium to be named for a black man. In his first season, Willaman's team finished with a 2–6 record, but posted a winning record in each of the three years that followed. His career coaching record at Iowa state was 14–15–3. This ranks him 16th in total wins and 13th in winning percentage in Iowa State football history.

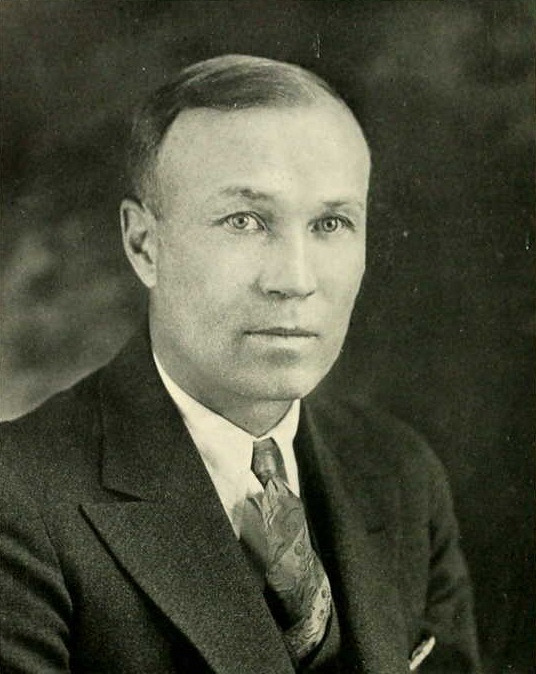
George F. Veenker went 21–22 during his coaching career at Iowa State

In February 1931, George F. Veenker accepted an offer to become the head football coach for Iowa State. Under Veenker, Iowa State experienced a brief period of success. When Veenker joined Iowa State, the team was coming off a winless season in 1930 and had lost 16 consecutive games dating back to October 1929. In his first year, the 1931 team defeated Missouri 20–0, Oklahoma 13–12, and Kansas State 7–6, compiling a 5–3 record and finishing in second place in the Big Six Conference. In November 1931, the Ames Daily Tribune-Times called Veenker "a veritable miracle man of football" for taking a school where "Cyclone football morale couldn't have been lower" and turning the program around in his first season. The highlight of Veenker's career as Iowa State's football coach was a 31–6 victory over the Iowa Hawkeyes in 1934. The game was the last meeting between the two schools until 1977. Veenker resigned in 1936, leaving an overall record of 21–22–8. Shortly after Veenker's death in 1959, the university-owned golf course was renamed Veenker Memorial Golf Course in his honor. During the 1938 season, James J. Yeager was in his second year as head coach. Despite going 3–6 in 1937, the Cyclones would go on to a then-best record of 7–1–1. The team was led by outstanding senior guard, Ed Bock. At the conclusion of the season Bock became the first consensus first-team All-American in Iowa State history. Bock was inducted into the College Football Hall of Fame in 1970. In 1942, Iowa State hired former Green Bay Packers All-Pro guard and three-time NFL champion Mike Michalske to be the new head coach. Michalske achieved moderate success in his five seasons at Iowa State, finishing with an 18–18 record. Abe Stuber took over as the Cyclones head coach in 1947 and coached the team until 1953, compiling a record of 24–38–3. Vince DiFrancesca was the 21st head coach at Iowa State, leading the team to a record of 6–21–1 from 1954 to 1956. Oregon State assistant coach Clay Stapleton was the head football coach at Iowa State for ten seasons. He is known mainly for his 1959 team the "Dirty Thirty". The Cyclones' struggles continued under his tutelage. Seven-win campaigns in 1959 and 1960 were the only winning seasons of his tenure. Stapleton was relieved of his duties following the 1967 season.

=== Johnny Majors era (1968–1972) ===
In 1968, in an attempt to turn the team around, Iowa State hired former standout Tennessee running back and up-and-coming Arkansas assistant Johnny Majors as the 24th head coach in program history. The rebuilding process got off to a slow start as the Cyclones finished 3–7 in his first two seasons. In 1970 the process started moving forward, and the team finished tied for 6th in the Big Eight with a record of 5–6. The 1971 team was picked to finish last in the Big Eight, but overcame odds to finish 4–3 in the conference and 8–3 in the regular season. The only teams they lost to in the conference, Nebraska, Oklahoma and Colorado, ended up first, second, and third in the final rankings. The team was led by junior running back George Amundson, who Majors called "the finest athlete I have coached in any job I have had." Iowa State had one defensive all-conference pick, LB Keith Schroeder. Amundson rushed for 1,260 yards, including a school-record 15 touchdowns. End Keith Krepfle had 40 receptions for 570 yards and 12 touchdowns. Quarterback Dean Carlson threw for a school-record 1,867 yards. These efforts were enough to earn a bid to the 1971 Sun Bowl, the first bowl game in program history. Iowa State was slated to play against LSU on December 18, 1971. Iowa State was outmatched by LSU and future NFL quarterback Bert Jones, falling to the Tigers, 33–15. LSU was ranked 11 after the bowls, but Iowa State was left out of the top 20.

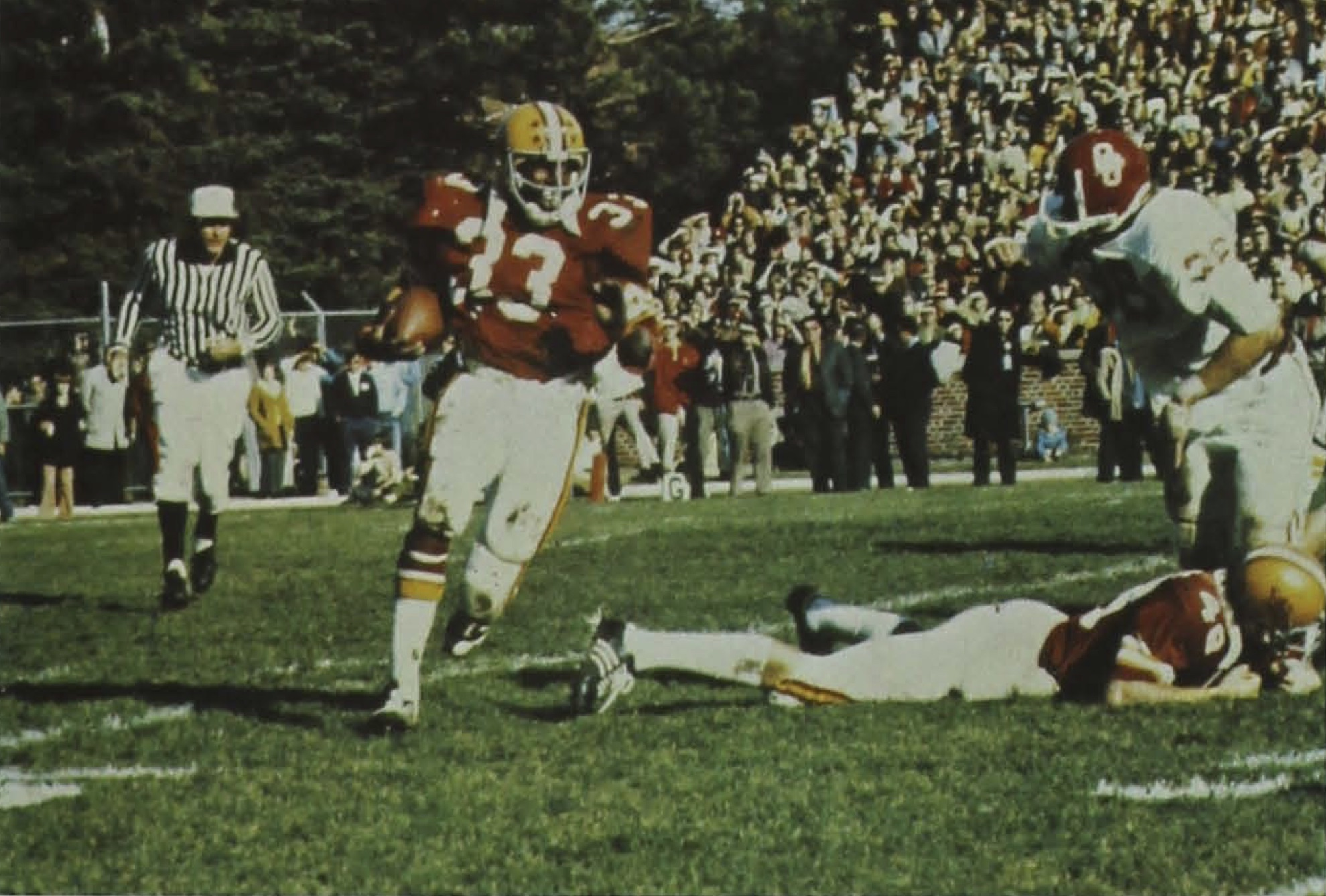
Iowa State tailback Mike Strachan #33 carries the football during a 1972 game against Oklahoma

In 1972, Iowa State saw the loss of five starters and the move of George Amundson from running back to quarterback to replace Dean Carlson. The Cyclones lost linebacker Matt Blair to a pre-season injury, which forced him into a medical redshirt. The Cyclones tied Nebraska 23–23 on a missed extra point by Iowa State's Tom Goedjen. Three players went on to be named to the first team All-Big Eight team as well be honored as All-Americans, offensive lineman Geary Murdoch, defensive end Merv Krakau and quarterback George Amundson. Amundson was named Big Eight player of the year over Heisman Trophy winner, Johnny Rodgers. It was in this year that Iowa State became known as D-Tackle U, similar to Penn State's moniker "Linebacker U". Iowa State's 5–5–1 regular season record was enough to earn them an invitation to the 1972 Liberty Bowl against Georgia Tech. Despite outstanding play, Iowa State lost 31–30 on a failed late-game two-point conversion attempt by George Amundson. At the conclusion of the 1972 season, Majors announced his departure from Iowa State to take the head coaching job at Pittsburgh.

=== Earle Bruce era (1973–1978) ===
In order to continue the success experienced under Johnny Majors Iowa State hired Earle Bruce out of Tampa. With newfound excitement around ISU football, the university broke ground on a new $7.6 million stadium that would eventually become Jack Trice Stadium. Despite future Minnesota Vikings star linebacker Matt Blair being a first team All-American, the Cyclones struggled to a 4–7 finish in Bruce's inaugural 1973 season. Over the next two seasons the Cyclones experienced moderate success but both seasons ended again with 4–7 records. However, Bruce's fourth team blossomed as one of the best teams in school history. En route to their 8–3 final record, the Cyclones scored wins against No. 7 Missouri and No. 9 Nebraska. In spite of the Cyclones' finishing the 1976 season ranked No. 19 in the AP Poll, Iowa State was ultimately snubbed by the bowls. Even so, Bruce was selected as Big Eight Coach of the Year. Iowa State followed up their strong 1976 campaign with another eight-win season in 1977. The Cyclones beat No. 9 Nebraska for the second time in a row and were ranked as high as No. 16 in the AP Poll at one point. Their 5–2 conference record and 8–4 overall record were good enough for a bid to the 1977 Peach Bowl against North Carolina State. Ultimately Iowa State lost the game 14–24. The Cyclones returned 14 starters from the 1977 Peach Bowl team including Heisman Trophy candidate, Dexter Green and Outland Trophy hopeful, Mike Stensrud. Iowa State's post season hopes came down to their last game against Colorado which was nationally televised. The game was close throughout, with ISU clinging to a 17–10 halftime lead. The second half was a defensive battle, but the ISU defense came up with big plays down the stretch. Mike Stensrud had 16 stops and caused a fumble to help ISU preserve a 20–16 win over the Buffaloes. The win earned ISU a bid to the 1978 Hall of Fame Classic against Texas A&M. Iowa State opened the game with two touchdowns, but was unable to convert the extra point on either attempt. The Cyclones were not able to contain future first round NFL draft pick Curtis Dickey, who rushed for 278 yards and a touchdown, and Iowa State lost 28–12. At the conclusion of the 1978 season, Bruce announced he would leave Iowa State to take the head coaching job at Ohio State.

=== Donnie Duncan era (1979–1982) ===
In order to continue the success found under Earle Bruce, Iowa State hired Oklahoma assistant Donnie Duncan as its 26th head football coach. He held the position for four seasons, from 1979 until 1982. His 1980 and 1981 Cyclones squads both made appearances in the national rankings. The 1981 Cyclones began the season at 5–1–1 and rose to No. 11 in the AP Poll. Led by future NFL players Dwayne Crutchfield, Dan Johnson, Karl Nelson and Chris Washington, the Cyclones tied No. 5 Oklahoma 7–7 and downed No. 8 Missouri 34–13. However, the success was short lived, and Duncan resigned with a career record of 18–24–2 after the 1982 season.

=== Jim Criner era (1983–1986) ===
Following the 1982 season Iowa State hired Jim Criner, who had won the 1980 NCAA Division I-AA Football Championship as the head coach at Boise State. During Criner's tenure the Cyclones experienced mild success, however they were embroiled in controversy, with multiple players arrested on different charges as well as several NCAA allegations of wrongdoings. The allegations included coaches giving players cash as well as giving recruits rides and meals. Criner's rough tenure came to an end November 12, 1986, when the school announced his firing. Criner's final career record at Iowa State was 17–25–2.

=== Jim Walden era (1987–1994) ===
Jim Walden succeeded Jim Criner at Iowa State, where he compiled a 28–57–3 over eight seasons. ISU had been hit with scholarship reductions by the NCAA, both because of infractions by the previous coach, and an overall reduction in scholarships for Division I-A for the 1988 season. In his first four years as Iowa State's head coach, he had just 57, 61, 63, and 67 scholarship players. Walden had only 47 scholarship players on the squad that he took to Lincoln to play Nebraska on October 28, 1989, and they lost 49–17. Walden was the last Iowa State coach to defeat Oklahoma, until Matt Campbell, which they did on October 20, 1990. Oklahoma was ranked 16th in the nation at the time. They had narrowly missed an upset the year before, losing in Ames 43–40. Walden's best record with the Cyclones was 6–5 in 1989. After the 1989 season, Walden was offered the head coaching job at the University of Arizona, but he declined, citing a number of people at Iowa State telling him it would be "devastating" if he left. In retrospect, Walden said he was "too dumb" to leave.

Walden's teams were plagued with injuries, especially at quarterback. In 1991, third-string quarterback Kevin Caldwell, who had begun the season as a tailback, started the final five games under center for the Cyclones. Walden played four different quarterbacks in a 41–0 loss to Kansas in 1991. In 1992, Walden installed the triple-option offense and had mixed results. Iowa State lost to in-state rivals Iowa and UNI early in the 1992 season. The loss to UNI was Walden's first to a Division I-AA school. It was also UNI's first victory over the Cyclones since 1900. Iowa State bounced back to shock the seventh-ranked Nebraska Cornhuskers at home on November 14, 1992. The victory was even more improbable as Walden's third-string quarterback, Marv Seiler, would make his first career start. Walden's 1993 squad went 3–8, but with an upset of 18th ranked Kansas State. Walden ended the 1993 campaign with a walk-on quarterback, Jeff St. Clair.

In the spring of 1994, Walden recruited running back Troy Davis out of Miami, Florida. Davis later had consecutive 2,000-yard rushing seasons, but not until after Walden's departure. After starting the 1994 campaign 0–2, many fans began to criticize Walden's coaching ability. He began his weekly press conference by handing out the records of Dennis Erickson, Johnny Majors, and Earle Bruce while they were at Washington State and Iowa State. He then handed out Iowa State's overall record in football since fielding its first team in 1892, which, at the time, was 423–461–45, a .480 percentage, and compared his record to that one. Walden claimed that he was as good a coach or better than Erickson, Majors, and Bruce. On Thursday, November 3, 1994, after starting the season 0–7–1, Walden informed his team that he would resign at season's end. He was allowed to coach his final three games by the university, but was banned from coaching his last game at Colorado because of criticizing the officials after the Kansas State game. Kansas State's Nyle Wiren had body-slammed Walden's quarterback Todd Doxzon into the turf head first. No penalty was called and Walden, with nothing to lose, went off on the officiating after the game: "I've kept quiet too long, but since I'm leaving there's nothing they can do about me. I think the refereeing in this league is atrocious ... What do you do with bad officials? Do they get fired? You fire bad players and bad coaches. Bad officials get a raise and go fishing." Walden coached his final game on November 12 against Nebraska in Ames. Iowa State had an 0–8–1 record and Nebraska was undefeated, with a No. 1 ranking. Unbelievably, Walden's Cyclones hung with the Huskers. At the end of the third quarter, Nebraska led by only two points, 14–12. The final quarter proved to be too much for Walden's team, and Nebraska won the game 28–12. The Cyclones finished with a winless 0–10–1 record in Walden's final 1994 season. Walden ranks sixth at Iowa State in total wins and 22nd in winning percentage.

=== Dan McCarney era (1995–2006) ===
To turn the program around Iowa State hired Wisconsin defensive coordinator, Dan McCarney. The lone bright spot that McCarney inherited was sophomore running back phenom Troy Davis. Davis would go on to break nearly every Iowa State rushing and touchdown record, most that still stand. Davis twice earned unanimous All-American honors, and became the first NCAA Division I-A running back to rush for over 2,000 yards in back-to-back seasons, a feat that has yet to be repeated. Davis finished 5th and 2nd in Heisman voting in his 1995 and 1996 campaigns respectively. McCarney would go 10–34 in his first four seasons as the Cyclones head coach. In McCarney's sixth season, the Cyclones were finally able to put together a competitive team. The 2000 Cyclones were quarterbacked by Sage Rosenfels. Sage is among many former Cyclones from the 2000 team to make it to the NFL. Others were J. J. Moses, Reggie Hayward, Ennis Haywood, Tony Yelk, Mike Banks, Jordan Carstens, Tyson Smith and James Reed. Despite Iowa State being picked by the media to finish 5th in the Big 12 North Division, the Cyclones finished with a 5–3 conference record and a 9–3 overall record. ISU finished the season ranked No. 25 and their nine wins were the program's best total since 1906. The Cyclones were then invited to play in the Insight.com Bowl against Pittsburgh, Iowa State's first appearance in a bowl game since the 1978 Peach Bowl. Iowa State was able to beat the Panthers 37–29, earning their first bowl victory in program history. In an interesting side note, Pittsburgh's defensive coordinator in this game, Paul Rhoads, would eventually become the 31st Iowa State head coach.

==== Emergence of Seneca Wallace ====
The 2001 season saw the emergence of JUCO transfer Seneca Wallace and star wide receiver Lane Danielson. The dynamic duo led the Cyclones to a last-second win over Iowa, a 7–5 overall record, and an invitation to the Independence Bowl against Alabama, their second consecutive bowl game. The Cyclones just missed a 47-yard field goal attempt with 0:46 remaining in the fourth, which would have given State the lead and potential victory. The Cyclones lost the game 13–14. Subsequent to the game there was some question about whether or not the field goal was actually good, as it sailed directly over one of the uprights. Seneca Wallace would lead the Cyclones to a 6–1 start in 2002, including a near-win against the Florida State Seminoles in the Eddie Robinson Classic at Arrowhead Stadium in Kansas City, Missouri. Wallace dove towards the goal line at the last second but was ruled out shy of the end zone. During a later home game versus Texas Tech, Wallace scored on a 12-yard touchdown by running an estimated 120 yards backwards, forwards, and sideways on the field. Wallace dodged tackles and received numerous blocks from his teammates, including one devastating block by running back Michael Wagner. The play briefly catapulted Wallace into Heisman Trophy contention and was recognized by ESPN as the "Play of the Week." It has since been recognized as one of the great plays in college football history. The play is known among Iowa State fans simply as "The Run." Ultimately their 7–7 record was enough to receive a bid to the Humanitarian Bowl against Boise State on the Broncos' blue home field where they were defeated, 16–34.

==== Final seasons and resignation ====
The 2004 season would be much more successful than the disappointing 2–10 2003 campaign for the Cyclones. Redshirt freshman Bret Meyer took over the quarterback spot and paired up with fellow redshirt freshman receiver Todd Blythe to make a lethal combination. The season got off to a slow start with a 2–4 overall record and a 0–3 record in the conference. McCarney turned the season around by winning the next four games in a row. The Cyclones had a chance to win the Big 12 North title but fell short after a Missouri defender intercepted a pass intended for Jon Davis in the end zone. The Cyclones would go on to play the Miami RedHawks in the 2004 Independence Bowl. In the Independence Bowl, Iowa State prevailed for a 17–13 win as Meyer rolled up 236 yards of total offense. Meyer and Stevie Hicks each rushed for over 100 yards, an Independence Bowl first. All-Big 12 cornerback Ellis Hobbs iced the win with a 41-yard interception return in the game's final minute, and the Cyclones held on to win 17–13. The Cyclones continued their success under McCarney in the 2005 season. High points during the season include a blowout win against No. 8 Iowa and a home victory over No. 22 Colorado. They missed out yet again on the Big 12 title when they lost in overtime to Kansas after a missed field goal by Bret Culbertson. They led the game in the 4th quarter but allowed Kansas to come back. The Cyclones earned a berth in the 2005 Houston Bowl, but lost 24–27 to the TCU Horned Frogs. TCU opened the game with back-to-back first quarter rushing touchdowns. The Cyclones responded with two Bret Meyer touchdown passes and forced a TCU safety. Late in the fourth quarter the game was tied at 24–24 but the Cyclones ultimately suffered yet another bowl loss on a fourth-quarter field goal. McCarney stepped down as head coach after a 4–8 2006 season, and finished his Iowa State head-coaching career as the program's winningest head coach with a 56–85 all-time record.

=== Gene Chizik era (2007–2008) ===
To replace Dan McCarney, Iowa State hired much-touted Texas defensive coordinator Gene Chizik. The Cyclones wore 1977 throwback jerseys for the 2007 contest against Iowa and re-introduced gold pants as a standard part of their uniform. It marked the 30th anniversary since the resumption of the Cy-Hawk rivalry as well as the 30th anniversary of the 1977 Iowa State Peach Bowl team. They finished the season 3–9, including a 15–13 win over Iowa, and back-to-back wins against Kansas State and Colorado. All three wins were upsets. In 2008, Iowa State opened with two wins against weaker non-conference foes, before losing their next 10 games to finish the season 2–10. Chizik left the Cyclones suddenly after the season to become the head football coach at Auburn amid great acrimony.

=== Paul Rhoads era (2009–2015) ===
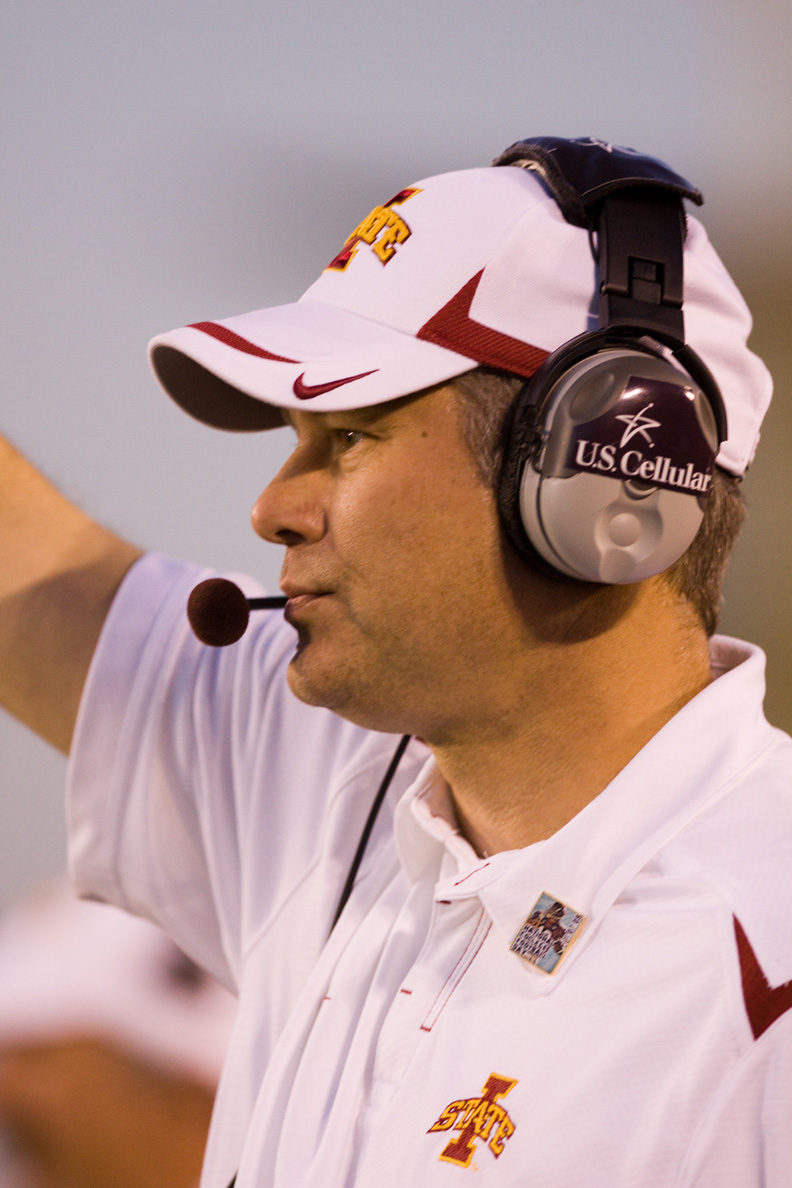
Rhoads as the head coach of Iowa State during a home game against Oklahoma State

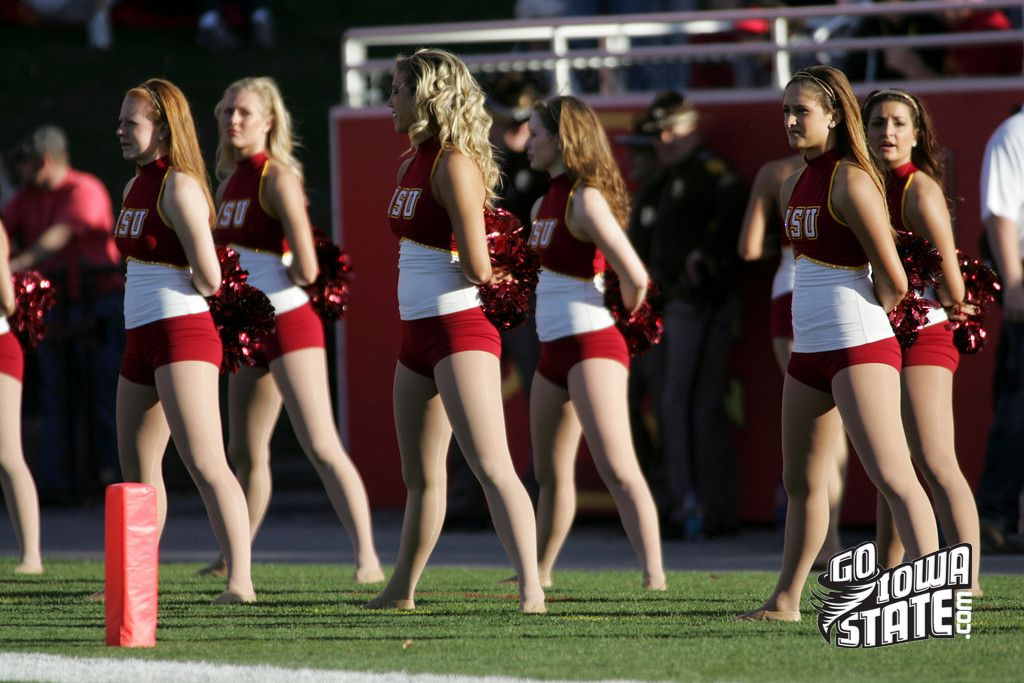
Cyclone cheerleaders, 2009

Auburn defensive coordinator Paul Rhoads was introduced as the 31st head coach of the Iowa State Cyclones on December 20, 2008. Rhoads had previously spent time at Iowa State as an assistant coach in the late 1990s and was raised only 20 miles from Ames in Ankeny. His father, Cecil, was one of the winningest coaches in Iowa high school history, coaching for more than three decades and has been inducted into the Iowa High School Football Coaches Hall of Fame. Rhoads' contract was reported to be a 5-year deal worth $5.75 million plus incentives. To round out his coaching staff, Rhoads hired up-and-coming offensive coordinator out of Rice, Tom Herman and veteran defensive coordinator Wally Burnham.

Rhoads opened his ISU career with a win over FCS North Dakota State. He then led Iowa State to a victory at Kent State first year, ending a 17-game Cyclones road losing streak. In October 2009 the Cyclones defeated Baylor to end an 11-game losing stretch against conference opponents, and then went on to defeat Nebraska in Lincoln for the first time since 1977. Their 6–6 record was enough to earn them an invitation to the Insight.com Bowl against Minnesota. Rhoads would win his first bowl game in his inaugural year as coach at Iowa State, beating the Golden Gophers 14–13. The lone highlight of the 2010 season was the first ever win at Texas in school history, upsetting the 22nd-ranked Longhorns 28–21. The Cyclones would finish the season 3–5 in the Big 12 and 5–7 overall.

In 2011 Iowa State started off the season 3–0 including a triple-overtime win over Iowa in Ames, and a win over Connecticut in East Hartford. The Cyclones would drop the next four games, starting out 0–4 in conference play, but they quickly bounced back with a 41–7 win on October 29 at No. 19 Texas Tech. In that game, Iowa State managed to rack up 512 total yards, the most since the Nov 22, 2008 game at Kansas State. Several other school records were broken, including first-ever win in Lubbock, largest margin of victory against a ranked opponent, and most points scored against a ranked opponent since November 9, 1996. On November 18, Iowa State faced off against undefeated No. 2 Oklahoma State led by Heisman frontrunner Brandon Weeden and two-time Biletnikoff winner Justin Blackmon in Ames. Down 24–7 early in the second half, Iowa State came back with 17 unanswered points to force overtime. In overtime, Iowa State scored on its first play from scrimmage, but Oklahoma State answered back with their own touchdown. In the second overtime, Iowa State forced an interception and ran three Jeff Woody dives in a row to beat Oklahoma State 37–31, smashing Oklahoma State's chances of playing for a national championship and Brandon Weeden's Heisman shot. Iowa State became bowl eligible with the win and improved to 6–4. The win over Oklahoma State marked Iowa State's first ever win against an opponent in the top 6 (AP polls). The Cyclones finished the season 6–6 and would receive an invitation to face the Rutgers Scarlet Knights in the Pinstripe Bowl, which they went on to lose, 27–13.

The Cyclones opened the 2012 season 3–0 including a 9–6 win at Iowa for the first time in 10 years. The other major highlight of the season was ending TCU's then-longest winning streak in college football by upsetting the No. 15 ranked Horned Frogs in Fort Worth 37–23. The 2012 season ended 6–7 and a berth in that year's Liberty Bowl against the Tulsa Golden Hurricane. Iowa State opened the game strong but they ultimately lost 31–17. While things appeared to be moving in a positive direction for the Cyclones, Rhoads' future teams were unable to continue the success of his earlier teams. In his final three seasons, the Cyclones won just four Big 12 games (including a winless conference record in 2014) and went 8–27 overall. The 2015 season proved to be particularly difficult, as the Cyclones held double-digit halftime leads against both Oklahoma State and Kansas State only to lose both games late in the fourth quarter. Following a 38–35 loss to Kansas State on November 21, in which he came under heavy criticism for play-calling in the game's final 90 seconds, Rhoads was fired as head coach, effective at the conclusion of the season.

=== Matt Campbell era (2016–2025) ===
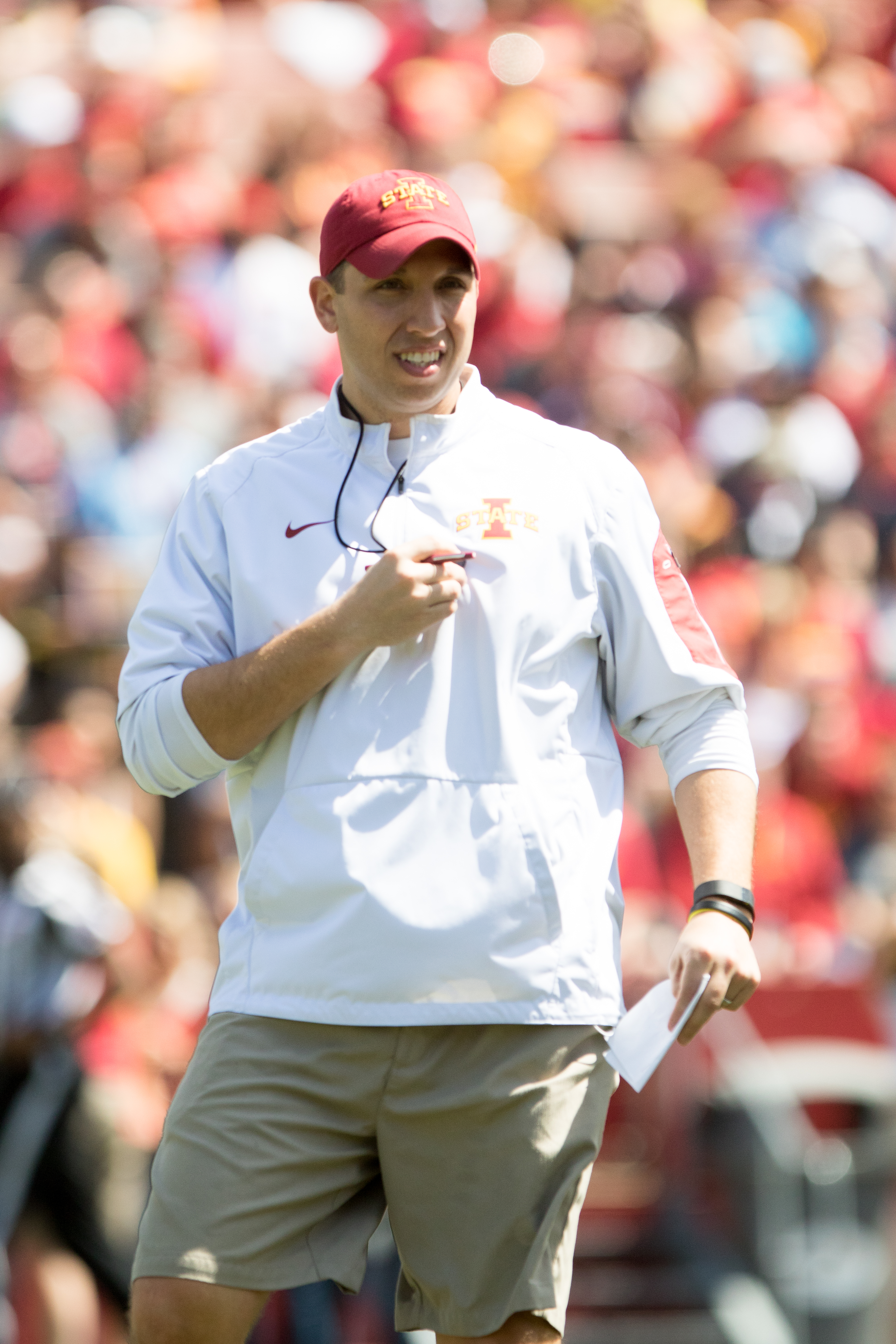
Head coach Matt Campbell

Matt Campbell, who had been the head coach at the University of Toledo, was named head coach at Iowa State on November 29, 2015. Campbell signed a six-year contract worth $2 million his first year. Campbell finished his first season as a Cyclone with a record of 3–9. Despite the disappointing record there were several high points during the season that showed progress including several near upsets and a blowout win over Texas Tech. The 66–10 rout of the Red Raiders included breaking several school records including points scored in a conference game.

In Campbell's second season, the Cyclones experienced greater on-field success. After opening the season 2–2, the Cyclones upset the eventual conference champions the No. 3 ranked Oklahoma Sooners. This was Iowa State's first win in Norman since 1990 and only their sixth win against Oklahoma all-time. They followed up the Oklahoma win by going undefeated in the month of October, including a win over No. 4 TCU. During the season the Cyclones were ranked as high as No. 14 in the AP Poll. Finishing the regular season 7–5 and fourth in the Big 12, Iowa State was invited to the Liberty Bowl where they defeated No. 20 Memphis 21–20, their first bowl victory in eight years. Campbell agreed to a six-year, $22.5 million extension with the school on November 27, 2017. On November 30, 2017, Campbell was named the Big 12 Coach of the Year. In the 2018 season, the Cyclones had a disappointing 1–3 start. However, coach Campbell lead the Cyclones to a regular season record of 8–4, including 6 Big 12 conference wins, and a win over No. 6 West Virginia. The Cyclones were invited to the Alamo Bowl, where they lost 28–26 to Washington State. On December 3, 2019, Campbell and Iowa State agreed to a contract extension through 2025.

==== Big 12 Championship and New Year's Six Appearances ====
Featuring Quarterback Brock Purdy, and All-American Running Back Breece Hall, the 2020 season was one of the most successful seasons in Cyclones history. Despite losing their season opener to the Louisiana Ragin' Cajuns from the Sun Belt Conference, they recovered quickly and defeated No. 18 Oklahoma two weeks later in Ames. Two weeks later, the No. 17 Cyclones lost to No. 6 Oklahoma State 24–21 in Stillwater. This would be their only conference loss for the season, as they went on to win the rest of their regular season games and clinched a spot in their first-ever Big 12 Championship Game, a rematch with No. 10 Oklahoma. At the time of the Big 12 Championship Game, the Cyclones were ranked No. 6 in the College Football Playoff rankings, their highest CFP ranking ever. Although the Cyclones lost this game 27–21, they were invited to the Fiesta Bowl, where they defeated the No. 25 Oregon Ducks 34–17 in their first-ever New Year's Six bowl game. After the season ended, the Cyclones finished ranked No. 9 in both the AP and Coaches Poll, their highest final ranking ever. On February 8, 2021, Campbell and Iowa State agreed to a contract extension through 2028.

==== Betting scandal ====
In 2023, the Cyclones team became embroiled in an illegal sports-betting scandal. Both defensive lineman Isaiah Lee and the Cyclones’ leading rusher for the 2022 season Jirehl Brock were charged following an investigation into illegal sports betting, and they subsequently left the team. Three other players charged in the investigation were quarterback Hunter Dekkers, offensive lineman Jacob Remsburg and tight end DeShawn Hanika all of which remained on the team roster, with Remsburg being the only to play again for the Cyclones. Despite the scandal, the Cyclones were able to finish with a winning record and a trip to a bowl game after being led by newly starting quarterback Rocco Becht and first year offensive coordinator Nathan Scheelhaase.

In 2024 the Cyclones offence featured Jaylin Noel and Jayden Higgins, combining for 17 touchdowns. They tied the best start in school history, including a 20-19 upset over No. 21 Iowa. They then lost two straight to Texas Tech and Kansas, but won their last 3, granting them a spot in the Big 12 championship against eventual playoff contender Arizona State. They lost 19-45, with starting running back Abu Sama III fumbling twice. They ended the season with a win against No. 13 Miami 42-41 in the Pop-Tarts bowl.

The Cyclones were ranked 22nd nationally to begin the 2025 season, and opened the season in Dublin, Ireland, defeating No. 17 Kansas State 24-21 in the Aer Lingus College Football Classic. The Cyclones were undefeated through September, with a win over rivals Iowa, and entered October ranked 14th nationally with a 5-0 record. However, the Cyclones would then lose their next four games, before finishing the season on a three game winning streak to earn an 8-4 record.

At the finish of the 2025 season, Matt Campbell was hired by Penn State to be their head coach. More than 20 former Iowa State players left the program to join Campbell at Penn State.

On December 5th 2026, Iowa State announced they had reached a five year agreement with Jimmy Rogers to serve as the new head coach.

== Conference affiliations ==
- Independent (1892–1907)
- Missouri Valley Intercollegiate Athletic Association (1908–1927)
- Big Six/Seven/Eight Conference (1928–1995)
- Big 12 Conference (1996–present)

== Championships ==
=== Conference championships ===
Iowa State has won two conference championships in school history. Both Iowa State conference championships were during their membership in the Missouri Valley Intercollegiate Athletic Association (MVIAA), which would later be known as the Big Eight Conference. Iowa State currently has the longest conference championship drought in FBS history.

| Year | Conference | Coach | Overall record | Conference record |
|---|---|---|---|---|
| 1911† | MVIAA | Clyde Williams | 6–1–1 | 2–0–1 |
| 1912† | MVIAA | Clyde Williams | 6–2 | 2–0 |

† Co-champions

=== Division championships ===
Iowa State competed in the Big 12 North Division from 1996 to 2010, winning a share of one division title during that time (since 2011, the conference has had the top two teams matched for the title game).

| Year | Division | Coach | Overall record | Conference record | Opponent | CG result |
|---|---|---|---|---|---|---|
| 2004† | Big 12 North | Dan McCarney | 7–5 | 4–4 | N/A lost tie-breaker to Colorado | |

† Co-champions

=== Associated Press Poll appearances ===
As of Week 1 of the 2022 season, Iowa State has made 70 appearances in the Associated Press poll and been ranked in the final Associated Press poll of the season four times.

| Year | Ranking | Record |
|---|---|---|
| 1976 | No. 19 | 8–3 |
| 2000 | No. 25 | 9–3 |
| 2020 | No. 9 | 9–3 |
| 2024 | No. 15 | 11–3 |

== Bowl games ==
Iowa State has appeared in 19 bowl games. Their overall bowl record is 6–13.

| Date | Coach | Bowl | Opponent | Result |
|---|---|---|---|---|
| December 18, 1971 | Johnny Majors | Sun Bowl | LSU | L 15–33 |
| December 18, 1972 | Johnny Majors | Liberty Bowl | Georgia Tech | L 30–31 |
| December 31, 1977 | Earle Bruce | Peach Bowl | NC State | L 14–24 |
| December 20, 1978 | Earle Bruce | Hall of Fame Classic | Texas A&M | L 12–28 |
| December 28, 2000 | Dan McCarney | Insight.com Bowl | Pittsburgh | W 37–29 |
| December 27, 2001 | Dan McCarney | Independence Bowl | Alabama | L 13–14 |
| December 31, 2002 | Dan McCarney | Humanitarian Bowl | Boise State | L 16–34 |
| December 28, 2004 | Dan McCarney | Independence Bowl | Miami (OH) | W 17–13 |
| December 31, 2005 | Dan McCarney | Houston Bowl | TCU | L 24–27 |
| December 31, 2009 | Paul Rhoads | Insight Bowl | Minnesota | W 14–13 |
| December 30, 2011 | Paul Rhoads | Pinstripe Bowl | Rutgers | L 13–27 |
| December 31, 2012 | Paul Rhoads | Liberty Bowl | Tulsa | L 17–31 |
| December 30, 2017 | Matt Campbell | Liberty Bowl | Memphis | W 21–20 |
| December 28, 2018 | Matt Campbell | Alamo Bowl | Washington State | L 26–28 |
| December 28, 2019 | Matt Campbell | Camping World Bowl | Notre Dame | L 9–33 |
| January 2, 2021 | Matt Campbell | Fiesta Bowl † | Oregon | W 34–17 |
| December 29, 2021 | Matt Campbell | Cheez-It Bowl | Clemson | L 13–20 |
| December 29, 2023 | Matt Campbell | Liberty Bowl | Memphis | L 26–36 |
| December 28, 2024 | Matt Campbell | Pop-Tarts Bowl | Miami (FL) | W 42–41 |

† New Year's Six game

== Head coaches ==
Iowa State has had 34 head coaches in program history. The most recent head coach was Matt Campbell.

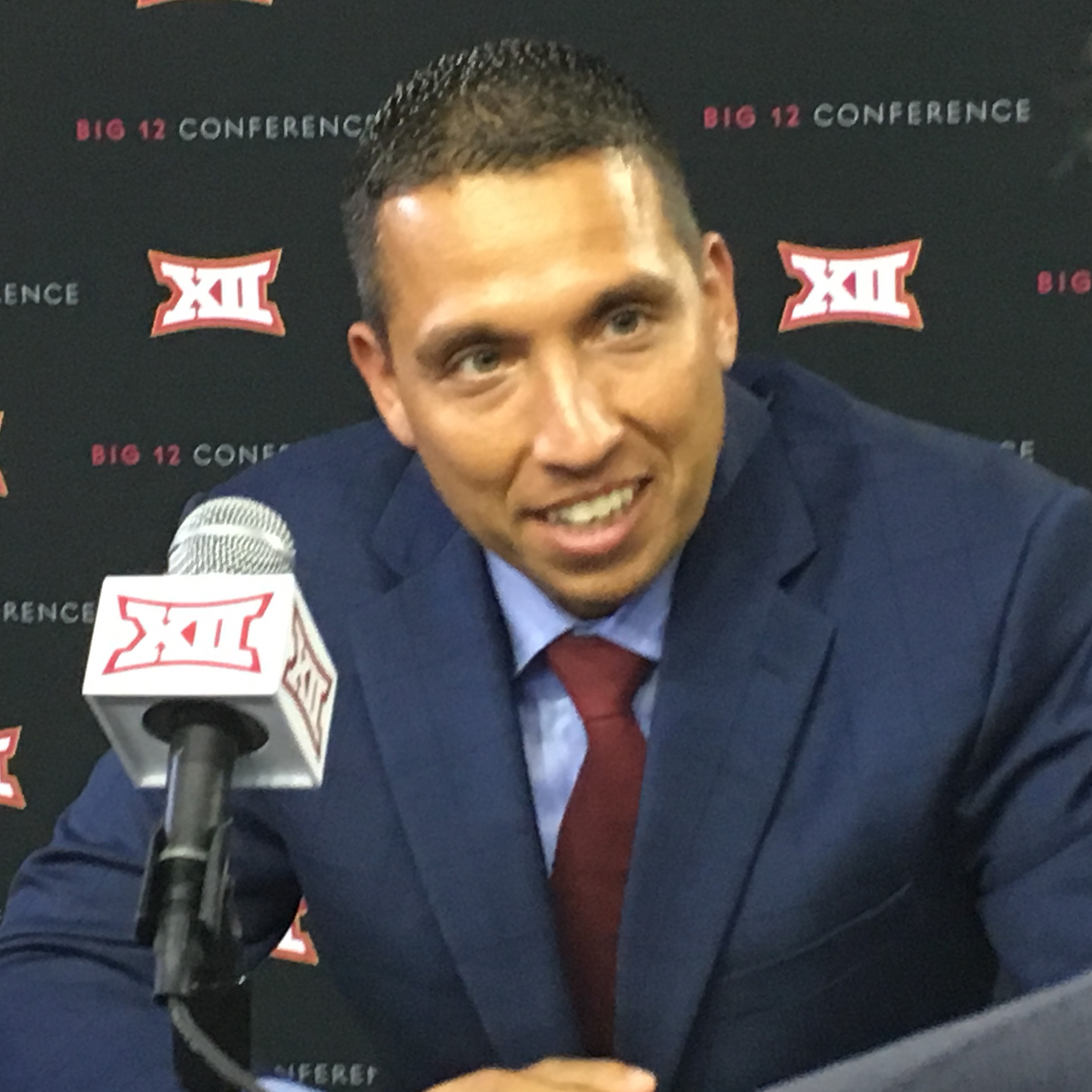
Former head coach Matt Campbell is the winningest coach in Iowa State history.

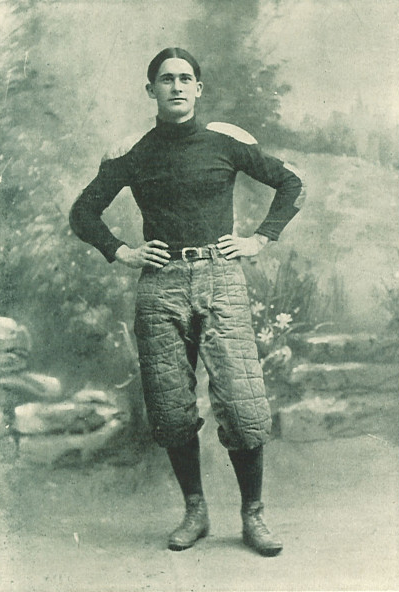
Clyde Williams led the Cyclones to conference championships in 1911 and 1912.

| Years | Coach | Seasons | Wins | Losses | Ties | Pct. |
|---|---|---|---|---|---|---|
| 1892 | Ira C. Brownlie | 1 | 1 | 0 | 1 | .750 |
| 1893 | W. F. Finney | 1 | 0 | 3 | 0 | .000 |
| 1894 | Bert German | 1 | 5 | 1 | 0 | .833 |
| 1895–1899 | Pop Warner | 4 1/3 | 18 | 8 | 0 | .692 |
| 1899 | Joe Meyers | 2/3 | 4 | 4 | 1 | .500 |
| 1900 | C. E. Woodruff | 1 | 2 | 5 | 1 | .313 |
| 1901 | Edgar Clinton | 1 | 2 | 6 | 2 | .300 |
| 1902–1906 | A. W. Ristine | 5 | 36 | 10 | 1 | .766 |
| 1907–1912 | Clyde Williams | 6 | 33 | 14 | 2 | .694 |
| 1913–1914 | Homer C. Hubbard | 2 | 8 | 7 | 0 | .533 |
| 1915–1919 | Charles Mayser | 5 | 21 | 11 | 2 | .647 |
| 1920 | Norman C. Paine | 1 | 4 | 4 | 0 | .500 |
| 1921 | Maury Kent | 1 | 4 | 4 | 0 | .500 |
| 1922–1925 | Sam F. Willaman | 4 | 14 | 15 | 3 | .484 |
| 1926–1930 | Noel Workman | 5 | 11 | 27 | 3 | .305 |
| 1931–1936 | George Veenker | 6 | 21 | 22 | 8 | .490 |
| 1937–1940 | James Yeager | 4 | 16 | 19 | 1 | .458 |
| 1941–1942 | Ray Donels | 1 1/3 | 3 | 8 | 1 | .292 |
| 1942–1946 | Mike Michalske | 4 2/3 | 18 | 18 | 3 | .500 |
| 1947–1953 | Abe Stuber | 7 | 24 | 38 | 3 | .393 |
| 1954–1956 | Vince DiFrancesca | 3 | 6 | 21 | 1 | .232 |
| 1957 | Jim Myers | 1 | 4 | 5 | 1 | .450 |
| 1958–1967 | Clay Stapleton | 10 | 42 | 53 | 4 | .444 |
| 1968–1972 | John Majors | 5 | 24 | 30 | 1 | .445 |
| 1973–1978 | Earle Bruce | 6 | 36 | 32 | 0 | .529 |
| 1979–1982 | Donnie Duncan | 4 | 18 | 24 | 2 | .432 |
| 1983–1986 | Jim Criner | 3 4/5 | 16 | 24 | 2 | .405 |
| 1986 | Chuck Banker | 1/5 | 1 | 1 | 0 | .500 |
| 1987–1994 | Jim Walden | 8 | 28 | 57 | 3 | .335 |
| 1995–2006 | Dan McCarney | 12 | 56 | 85 | 0 | .397 |
| 2007–2008 | Gene Chizik | 2 | 5 | 19 | 0 | .208 |
| 2009–2015 | Paul Rhoads | 7 | 32 | 55 | 0 | .368 |
| 2016–2025 | Matt Campbell | 10 | 72 | 55 | 0 | .567 |
| 2026–present | Jimmy Rogers | 1 | 4 | 4 | 0 | .600 |

== Individual accomplishments ==
=== First team All-Americans ===
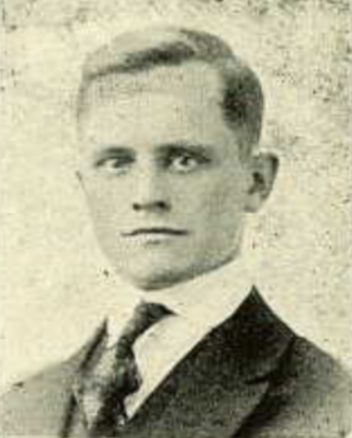
Polly Wallace was named to the 1926 All-America Team

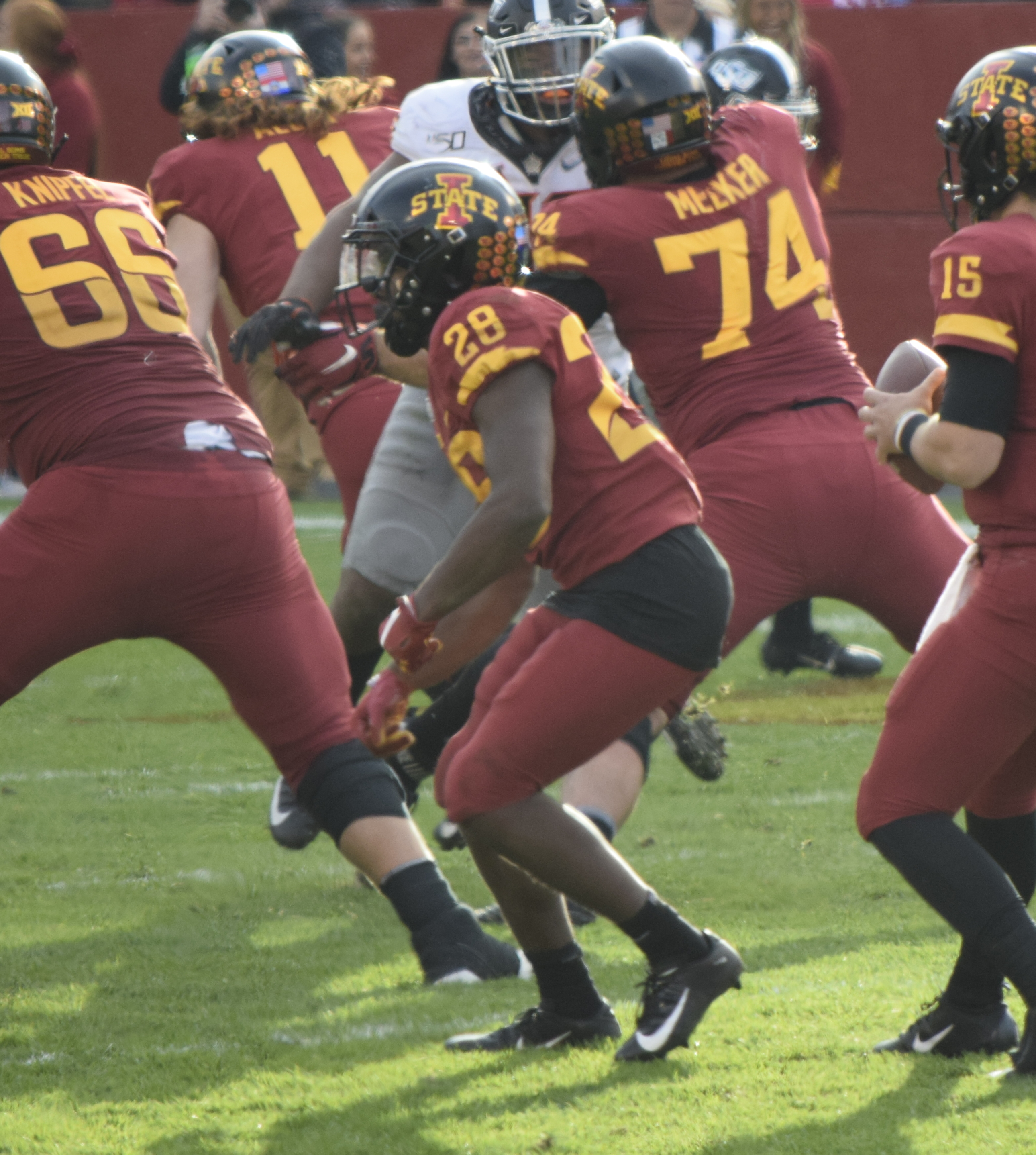
2× All-American Breece Hall

Every year, several publications release lists of their ideal "team". The athletes on these lists are referred to as All-Americans. The NCAA recognizes five All-American lists. They are the Associated Press (AP), American Football Coaches Association (AFCA), Football Writers Association of America (FWAA), Sporting News (TSN), and the Walter Camp Football Foundation (WCFF). Since the establishment of the team in 1892, Iowa State has had 16 players honored a total of 24 times as First Team All-America for their performance on the field of play. Included in these selections are 6 consensus selections, with four individuals earning the honor (Troy Davis and Breece Hall having earned the honor twice).

Consensus All-Americans

| Name | Position | Year | Ref. |
|---|---|---|---|
| Ed Bock | G | 1938 | |
| Mike Busch | TE | 1989 | |
| Troy Davis | RB | 1995, 1996 | |
| Breece Hall | TB | 2020, 2021 | |

=== College Football Hall of Fame inductees ===
In 1951, the College Football Hall of Fame opened in South Bend, Indiana. Since then, Iowa State has had two players inducted into the Hall of Fame.

Ed Bock is widely considered the greatest offensive lineman in Iowa State history. During his 1938 senior season the team finished with a then best 7–1–1 record. At the conclusion of the season Bock became the first consensus first team All-American in ISU history. Following his football career at Iowa State Bock worked for the Monsanto Chemical Company where he eventually rose to become CEO and President. Bock was inducted into the College Football Hall of Fame in 1970.

Troy Davis is considered the greatest running back in Iowa State history. Davis twice earned consensus All-American honors and was the first NCAA Division I-A running back to rush for over 2,000 yards in back-to-back seasons, a feat that has yet to be repeated. Davis finished 5th and 2nd in Heisman voting in his sophomore and junior seasons, respectively. After completing his college career, Davis went on to have a 10-year career in the NFL and CFL, including as a member of the Edmonton Eskimos 2005 Grey Cup championship team. Davis was inducted into the College Football Hall of Fame in the class of 2016.

| Name | Seasons | Position | Inducted | Ref. |
|---|---|---|---|---|
| Ed Bock | 1936–1938 | G | 1970 | |
| Troy Davis | 1993–1996 | RB | 2016 | |

=== Heisman Trophy ===
The Heisman Trophy is awarded annually to the nation's most outstanding college football player. In 1959 after Dwight Nichols led the Big 7 in total yardage (1,358) and points (54) he became the first player in Iowa State history to receive Heisman votes coming tied for 7th place overall. After his stellar 1972 campaign George Amundson became the second player in ISU history to receive Heisman votes when he finished in 7th place. In 1995 after a 23-year absence Troy Davis became the third Cyclone to gain Heisman attention when he finished 5th. Then in 1996 at the conclusion of his second consecutive 2,000 yard season Davis nearly won the Heisman but ultimately was runner-up. In 2020, Breece Hall became the fourth Cyclone to receive Heisman votes when he finished in 6th place.

Heisman Trophy voting
| Name | Year | Position | Class | Points | Place |
|---|---|---|---|---|---|
| Dwight Nichols | 1959 | RB | Senior | 126 | T-7th |
| George Amundson | 1972 | RB | Senior | 219 | 7th |
| Troy Davis | 1995 | RB | Sophomore | 402 | 5th |
| Troy Davis | 1996 | RB | Junior | 1,174 | 2nd |
| Breece Hall | 2020 | RB | Sophomore | 64 | 6th |
| Breece Hall | 2021 | RB | Junior | 17 | 10th |

=== Retired numbers ===
Iowa State Cyclones retired numbers
| No. | Player | Pos. | Tenure | Year retired | Ref. |
| 30 | Mike Cox | FB | 1963–1964 | 1964 | |

== Rivalries ==
=== Iowa ===
Iowa and Iowa State played each other 24 times between 1894 and 1934, before the Cy-Hawk Trophy was established. It was originally conceived and created as a traveling trophy by the Greater Des Moines Athletic Club in 1976, the trophy was first presented to the winner by Iowa Governor Robert D. Ray in 1977. That game was the first meeting between the two since 1934. The series halted after 1934 after then University of Iowa Athletic Director and head football coach Ossie Solem would not return calls to reschedule the rivalry. The rivalry was once again temporarily put to a halt in 2020 due to the COVID-19 pandemic. Of the 69 games in the series played through 2022, 40 of them have been played in Iowa City while 29 games have been contested in Ames. Iowa leads the series 47–24 through the 2024 season.

=== Kansas State ===
The teams first met in 1917, when both schools were members of the Big Eight Conference. The match-up continued as an annual conference game through the schools' shift into the Big 12 Conference. The series has been dominated by long winning streaks for both teams, with each team's longest winning streak at 10 games. Iowa State leads the series 55–50–4 through the 2025 season.

=== Missouri ===
Missouri and Iowa State first met in 1896 and the regional rivalry was born. Before the 1959 match-up between the two schools, which took place in Ames, Iowa, field testing showed that the telephones the two schools used to communicate with their coaches in the coaches box were wired so that either school could hear what was happening on the other sideline. The problem was fixed before the game, but neither of the two coaches knew that. Northwestern Bell Telephone Company of Ames then decided to have a trophy made to commemorate the incident, and thus the Telephone Trophy was born. When Missouri left the Big 12 for the SEC the rivalry was essentially ended. Missouri leads the rivalry 61–34–9 all-time.

=== Nebraska ===
The teams first met in 1896, and played each uninterrupted from 1926 to 2010. A natural rivalry developed between the two bordering state schools in the Midwest, but the series has been very one-sided towards Nebraska, especially during the Tom Osborne era. The series was put a halt after Nebraska joined the Big Ten in 2011. Nebraska leads the series 85–18–2 through the 2024 season.

== Significant series ==
=== Kansas ===
The series between the midwestern universities dates back to the first meeting on October 15, 1898. The Jayhawks won that game by a score of 11–6. The teams have spent a large majority of their athletic histories as members of the same conference; first the Missouri Valley Intercollegiate Athletic Association from 1908 to 1927, the Big Eight Conference from 1928 to 1995 and the Big 12 Conference from 1996 to the present day. Both schools were members of the Big 12's North Division from 1996 to 2010 when the conference eliminated the divisional format. In November 2023, the Big 12 announced its scheduling matrix for the next four seasons, and in so doing did not protect Iowa State–Kansas as an annual matchup. After meeting in the 2024 and 2025 seasons as rotating opponents, the teams will not meet in 2026 barring a meeting in the 2026 Big 12 Championship Game. If true, 2026 will be the first year since 1931 that the Cyclones and Jayhawks won't meet on the football field.

== Facilities ==
=== Jack Trice Stadium ===
Jack Trice Stadium (formerly Cyclone Stadium) is a stadium in Ames, Iowa. It is primarily used for college football, and is the home field of the Iowa State University Cyclones. It opened on September 20, 1975 (with a win against Air Force), and with hillside tickets it officially has 61,500 seats. The current record for single-game attendance, 61,500, was set on September 5, 2015, when the Cyclones played Northern Iowa. In 1997, the stadium was named in honor of Jack Trice, ISU's first African American athlete and the school's first athletics-related fatality. The stadium is the only stadium in Division I named for an African American individual.

=== Bergstrom Indoor Training Facility ===
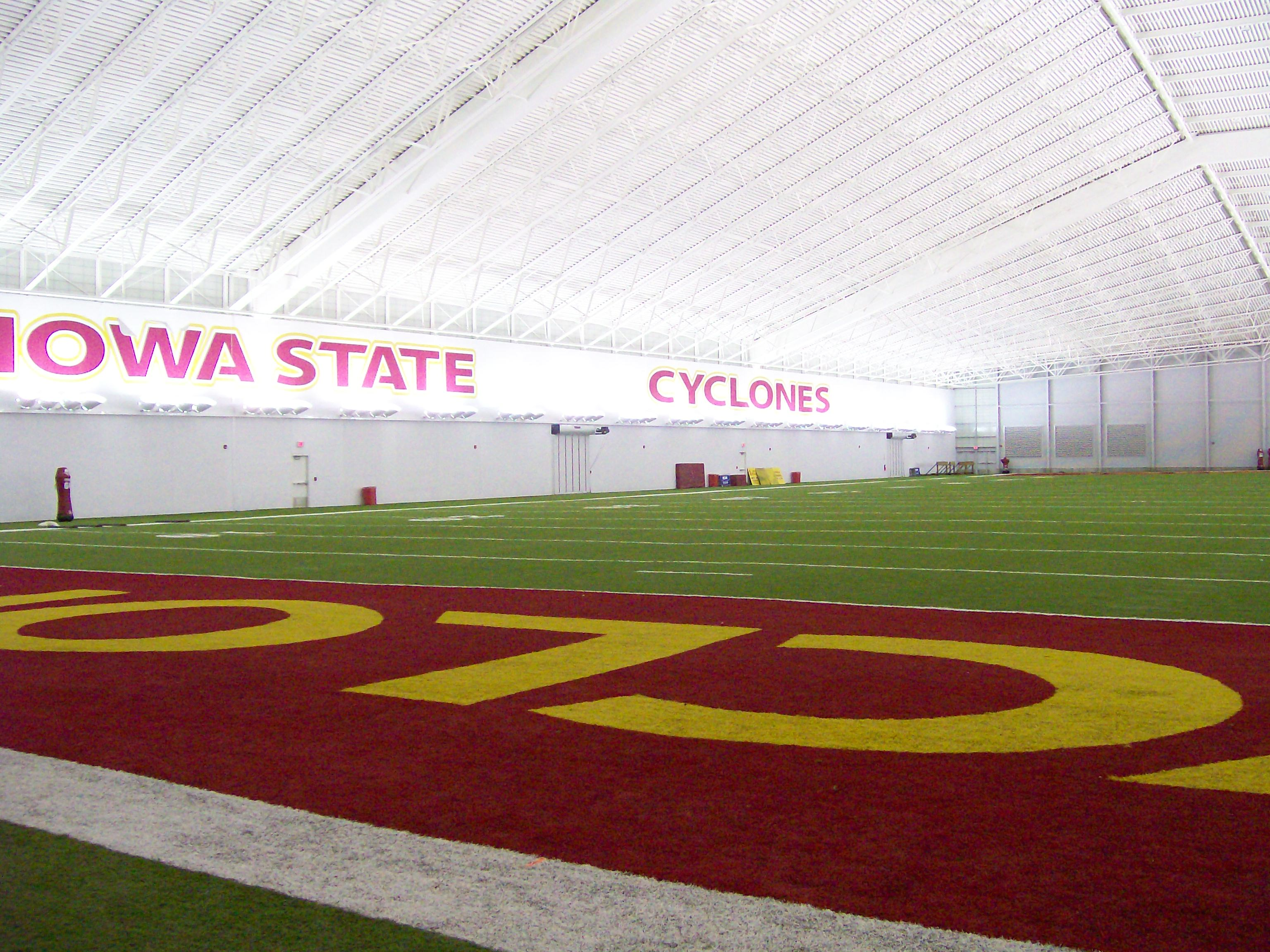
Bergstrom Indoor Practice Facility

The Steve and Debbie Bergstrom Indoor Training Facility opened in March 2004. It is a 92,000-square-foot (8,500 m^{2}) multi-purpose, indoor practice facility. Inside the facility is a full-sized football field. Though typically associated with football, it is also used for practice by the softball and soccer teams, as well as community events. The building sits just northwest of Jack Trice Stadium and is part of the Johnny Majors Practice Complex. The facility cost $9.6 million to build and was funded by private gifts to the athletic department and ISU Foundation.

On October 26, 2012, Iowa State dedicated a $20.6 million, 156,000 square-foot, expansion of the football facility with an additional lead gift from the Bergstrom family. This included replacing the playing surface of the indoor facility, a state-of-the-art strength and conditional facility, a coaches office complex, positional meeting rooms, an auditorium, and spacious locker rooms. This completed the goal for Iowa State to have a stand-alone football-only training facility.

=== Jacobson Athletic Building ===
Built in 1995 and located off the north end zone of Jack Trice Stadium, The Jacobson Athletic Building formerly housed the football offices, locker rooms, meeting rooms, strength and conditioning room, and sports medicine room. The space was renovated in 2008 and 2009 to use the vacated space by the football team. It now is home to men's and women's golf, tennis, swimming, wrestling, cross country and track and field. This allows the entire athletic department staff to be under one roof with the exception of men's and women's basketball and volleyball.

=== Former Stadiums ===
- State Field (1892–1913)
- Clyde Williams Field (1914–1974) Martin and Eaton residence halls now stand on the ground formerly occupied by Clyde Williams Field, northwest of Friley Hall and south of State Gym.

== Pageantry and traditions ==
=== Team name ===
Originally, the Iowa Agricultural College (Iowa State University) teams were known as the "Cardinals." The name was changed after Sept. 29, 1895, when under legendary coach Pop Warner the Cardinals routed the Northwestern Wildcats, 36–0. Inspired by an extremely active tornado (then called "cyclone") season, the next day, the Chicago Tribune headline read: "Struck by a Cyclone." The article went on to say, "Northwestern might as well have tried to play football with an Iowa cyclone as with the team it met yesterday." Since then the Iowa State teams have been known as the "Cyclones."

=== Jack Trice ===
Jack Trice was Iowa State's first African-American athlete; he was also the first and only Iowa State athlete to die from injuries sustained during athletic competition. He died three days after his first game playing for Iowa State against the University of Minnesota on October 6, 1923. He suffered a broken collarbone early on, but continued to play until he was trampled by a group of Minnesota players. It is disputed whether he was trampled on purpose or if it was an accident. A statue commemorates him outside of the stadium that is named for him, Jack Trice Stadium. His legacy was forgotten until the 1970s, when students discovered a plaque commemorating him in State Gym. They decided to put up a petition to name the stadium, at the time known as Cyclones Stadium, after him. Originally they got the field named after him in 1984. The stadium was named Jack Trice Stadium in 1997. It is the only NCAA Division I stadium named after an African-American.

=== Cannon ===
The members of the Iowa State Chapter of Alpha Sigma Phi man and maintain a cannon that is discharged at home football games when the Iowa State team takes the field, following the first kickoff, the kickoff following half-time, all Iowa State kickoffs, and immediately following an Iowa State touchdown.

=== Mascot ===
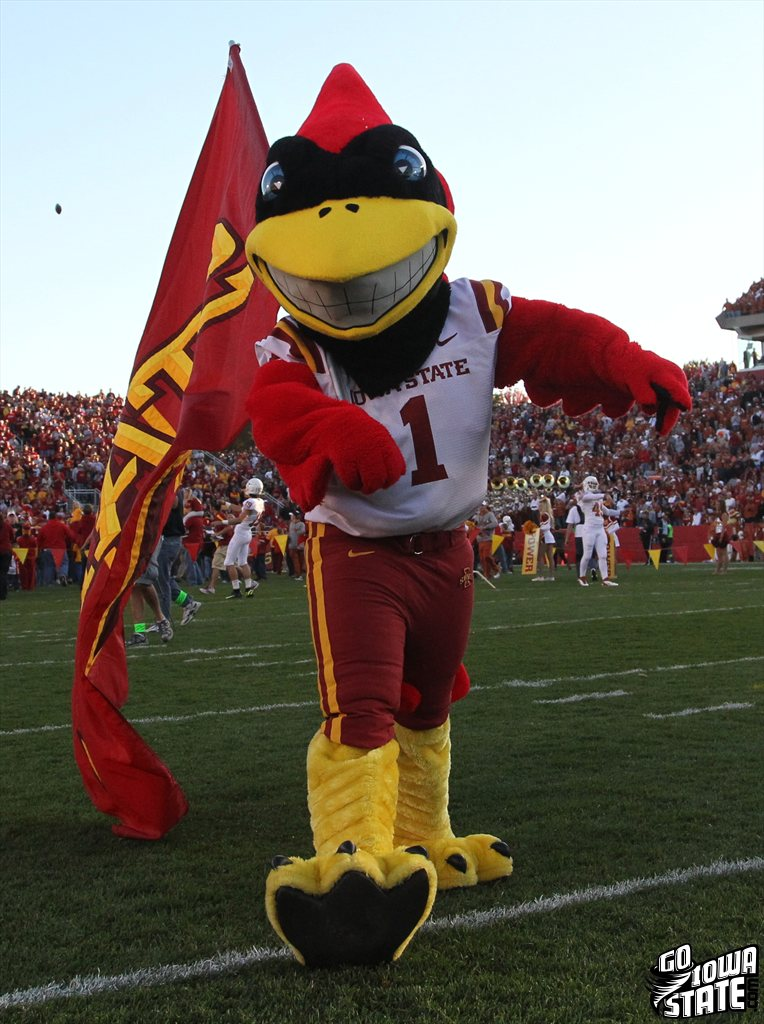
Cy the Cardinal, Iowa State's mascot.

Iowa State uses a cardinal, named Cy, as its mascot instead of an actual tornado or Cyclone. In 1954, the student pep council began the process of creating a mascot to build school spirit. As it would be difficult to, quote "stuff a cyclone", a cardinal was selected from the school's official colors and original team namesake. The name of Cy was selected via a naming contest, being submitted by 17 people.

Prior to the football matchup against the University of Colorado on November 12, 2005, a tornado touched down in Ames, Iowa, and forced fans to either stand out in the parking lot and watch the storm or flee to shelter in Hilton Coliseum. It created such an atmosphere that Iowa State was able to win over the favored Buffaloes 30–16. When asked about the event, Colorado coach Gary Barnett said, "I thought we had a pretty good mascot. But when we showed up at Iowa State and they had a real tornado, that's the real deal."

=== Tailgating ===
Iowa State is well regarded for tailgating. The layout of Jack Trice Stadium on a flood-plain accommodates ample parking space immediately surrounding the stadium. Cyclone fans typically arrive hours before kick-off in large SUVs and RVs to grill popular Midwestern foods such as pork loin, bratwurst, hamburgers, corn and hot dogs.

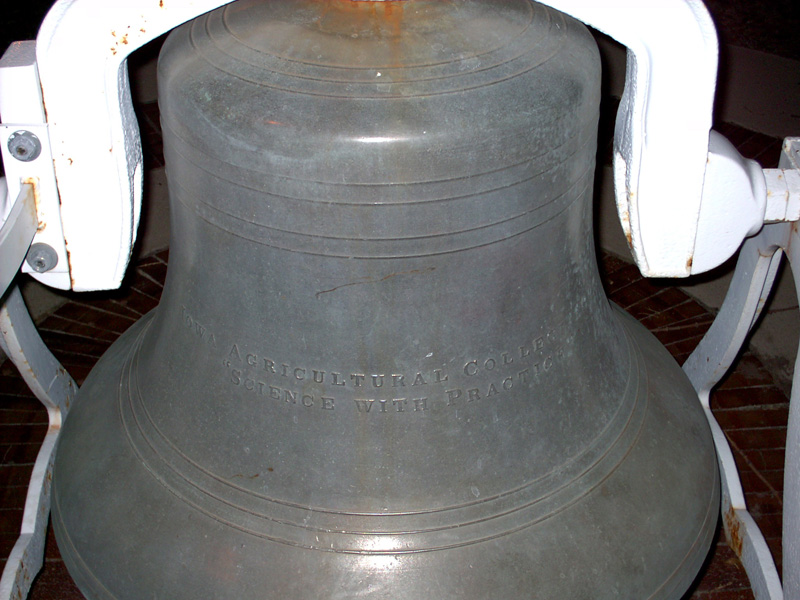
Iowa State's Victory Bell

=== Victory bell ===
Located immediately outside and north of Jack Trice Stadium, the victory bell is rung following a Cyclone victory. Forged in 1890 the victory bell served on campus to signal dismissal from classes before being moved to Clyde Williams Field and subsequently to Jack Trice Stadium.

=== Tornado siren ===
To go along with the installation of the new video board and sound system prior to the 2011 football season, a tornado siren is sounded after touchdowns, defensive stands, and other big plays. While the tornado siren is a new tradition, it is one that numerous Cyclones fans have asked the Iowa State athletic director to implement for many years, especially since the Colorado-Iowa State game of November 12, 2005, when a tornado touched down in Ames and sirens were heard throughout town during what normally would have been pregame activities. Since then, its implementation has become an extremely popular aspect of the Jack Trice Stadium experience.

== Future non-conference opponents ==
Schedules as of September 24, 2026.

Future non-conference opponents
| 2027 | 2028 | 2029 | 2030 | 2031 |
|---|---|---|---|---|
| South Dakota State; Aug. 28th | Tulane; Aug. 26th | at Tulane; Aug. 25th | South Dakota; Aug. 31st | Northern Iowa; Aug. 30th |
| Bowling Green; Sep. 4th | Northern Iowa; Sep. 2nd | North Dakota; Sep. 1st | at Iowa; Sep. 7th | Iowa; Sep. 6th |
| Iowa; Sep. 11th | at Iowa; Sep. 9th | Iowa; Sep. 8th | UNLV; Sep. 14th | |

== Cyclones in the NFL ==
First round draft picks

| Name | Position | Year | Overall pick | Team |
|---|---|---|---|---|
| George Amundson | RB | 1973 | 14 | Houston Oilers |
| Will McDonald IV | DE | 2023 | 15 | New York Jets |

=== Active NFL ===
As of April 2026

- Malik Verdon, Atlanta Falcons
- T.J. Tampa, Baltimore Ravens
- Eyioma Uwazurike, Denver Broncos
- Jayden Higgins, Houston Texans
- Jake Hummel, Houston Texans
- Xavier Hutchinson, Houston Texans
- David Montgomery, Houston Texans
- Jaylin Noel, Houston Texans
- Ben Nikkel, Indianapolis Colts
- Jalen Travis, Indianapolis Colts
- Charlie Kolar, Los Angeles Chargers
- Darien Porter, Las Vegas Raiders
- Domonique Orange, Minnesota Vikings
- Breece Hall, New York Jets
- Will McDonald IV, New York Jets
- Kene Nwangwu, New York Jets
- J. R. Singleton, Seattle Seahawks
- Brock Purdy, San Francisco 49ers
- Julian Good-Jones, Washington Commanders

== See also ==
- List of Iowa State Cyclones football All-Americans
- Iowa State Cyclones football statistical leaders
- List of Iowa State Cyclones in the NFL draft

== Bibliography ==
- Iowa State University (2006). Iowa State Cyclone Football (PDF). Archived from the original (PDF) on December 3, 2020.
- Miller, Jeffrey J. (August 3, 2015). Pop Warner. McFarland. ISBN 978-1-4766-2274-3.
