= Ed Bock =

American football player and businessman (1916–2004)

No. 38 – Iowa State Cyclones
- Position: Guard

Personal information
- Born: September 1, 1916; Fort Dodge, Iowa, U.S.
- Died: July 31, 2004 (aged 87); St. Louis, Missouri, U.S.
- Listed height: 6 ft 0 in (1.83 m)
- Listed weight: 202 lb (92 kg)

Career information
- High school: Fort Dodge
- College: Iowa State (1935–1938)

Awards and highlights
- Consensus All-American (1938); 2× First-team All-Big Six (1937, 1938); Second-team All-Big Six (1936)
- College Football Hall of Fame

Edward J. Bock (September 1, 1916 – July 31, 2004) was an American football player and businessman.

Bock was inducted into the College Football Hall of Fame in 1970 and retired as the CEO of Monsanto in 1972.

== College career ==
As a Cyclone, Bock played lineman both on offense and defense although his strongest position was offensive guard. He started all 26 games of his college career and earned all-Big Six Conference honors all three years as well. He was co-captain of the 7–1–1 1938 team which is considered one of the greatest teams in school history. That same season, he was named Iowa State's first ever unanimous first team All-American.

At the conclusion of his senior season, Bock played in the East–West Shrine Game, the Chicago Tribune College All-Star Game and the Dallas Dream Game at the Cotton Bowl against the Green Bay Packers. Upon graduation, Bock was offered a contract to play professional football after being drafted the Chicago Bears. He opted to stay at Iowa State and coach the line while working on his master's degree in mechanical engineering.

In 1970, Bock was inducted into the College Football Hall of Fame.

== After football ==
Once Bock completed his master's degree, he accepted a job with Monsanto. He worked his way up and was president and CEO by the time of his retirement in 1972.
