= History of Idaho Vandals football =

The University of Idaho's football program, nicknamed the "Vandals", began in 1893.

== History ==
=== Early history (1893–1977) ===
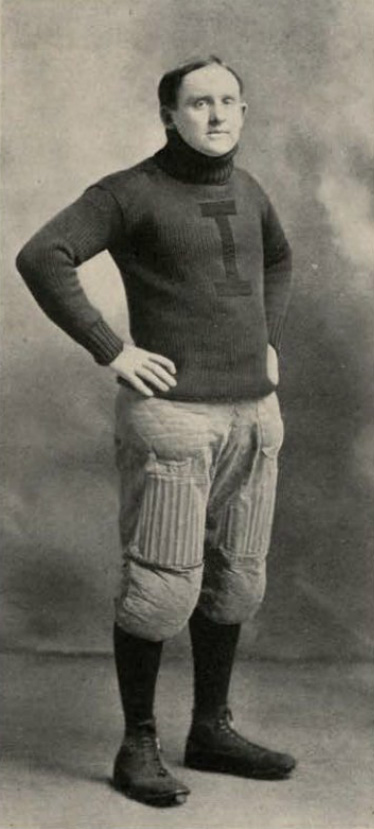
Coach Griffith

The University of Idaho fielded its first football team in 1893. It wasn't until 1917 that the program earned its nickname, the Vandals, after the UI basketball team under alumnus Hec Edmundson played defense with such ferocity that they "vandalized" their opponents and, thus, the nickname of Vandals was adopted for all school sports. Fred Herbold served as the Vandals head football coach in 1900 and 1901, compiling a record of 4–2–1. In 1902, John G. Griffith was hired as head football coach and athletic director at the University of Idaho. When Iowa football coach Alden Knipe retired after the 1902 season, school officials considered hiring Griffith but went with John Chalmers instead. Griffith continued as Idaho's head football coach through 1906, and is Idaho's longest tenured head football coach to date. The Vandals' first-ever forward pass was attempted against Washington State in 1907: it was completed for a touchdown from a drop-kick formation in the fourth quarter and led to a 5–4 victory. Following the First World War, Thomas Kelley led the Vandals for two years, then left for Missouri. He played college football as a tackle at the University of Chicago under head coach Amos Alonzo Stagg, and was previously the head coach at Alabama. In coach Robert Mathews' four seasons as head coach, the Vandals' first years in the Pacific Coast Conference, they won three consecutive rivalry games over Washington State. Idaho lost the other, Mathews' first in 1922, by a single point, and he remains the only Idaho head coach to date with multiple wins over Washington State. The Vandals made their first significant use of the forward pass under Mathews. Charles Erb was hired in May 1926 as head coach and director of athletics of the Vandals, where he compiled a 10–9–5 record in three seasons, including a PCC co-championship in 1927. Erb was the quarterback at California in the early 1920s on the "Wonder Teams" of hall of fame head coach Andy Smith. Leo Calland led Vandal football (and the UI athletic department) from 1929 to 1934, compiling a record of 21–30. He was a lineman for USC in the early 1920s and was the Trojans head basketball coach for two seasons. After Idaho, Calland was the football coach at San Diego State for seven seasons.

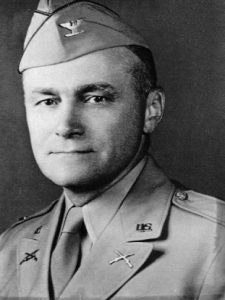
Col. Ted Bank during World War II

On February 23, 1935, Ted Bank, a heralded football player at the University of Michigan under Fielding Yost, was named the 14th head football coach of the Idaho Vandals, leaving his post as running backs coach at Tulane in New Orleans. He would stay in Moscow through the completion of the 1940 season. Following a 4–3–1 record in his third season on the Palouse in 1937, Bank was on the short list of many to succeed Harry Kipke as head coach at Michigan, his alma mater. Bank denied interest in replacing Kipke, a teammate at Michigan, and told the press, "I am perfectly satisfied at Idaho. I have not been contacted by the Michigan athletic board and would think twice before leaving Idaho." In January 1938, Idaho's state board of education announced that Bank had signed a three-year contract renewal and would remain as the university's football coach and director of physical education. His best season came that season, when the Vandals finished with a record of 6–3–1, with victories over Oregon State, Utah, and Utah State, and a tie with Washington. The 1937 and 1938 seasons were Idaho's only winning seasons in football between 1927 and 1963, when the Vandals went 5–4 as an independent under head coach Dee Andros (the tenth game on November 23 was canceled). The 1938 season was the highest winning percentage (.650) between 1927 and 1971. Consecutive winning seasons at Idaho were not achieved again until 1982–83 under Dennis Erickson in the Big Sky Conference in NCAA Division I-AA. (Idaho had fifteen consecutive winning seasons from 1982 to 1996.) The successes of 1937 and 1938 was not maintained as Idaho went 2–6 in 1939 and 1–7–1 in 1940 (and winless in conference games), giving Bank a six-year overall record of 18–33–3 (.361). Bank was fired as the Vandals' head football coach in January 1941, part of an upheaval that included the resignation of head basketball coach Forrest Twogood. Longtime college football coach Francis Schmidt was hired at Idaho in March 1941; he was previously the head coach at Ohio State University of the Big Ten Conference. The team was 4–5 in 1941 and 3–7 in 1942, but a lack of civilian manpower prior to the 1943 season due to World War II forced several PCC teams to put their programs on hiatus in September, including Idaho. Schmidt stayed on campus and assisted in the physical training of troops, but his health worsened in 1944 and he died in a Spokane hospital in September.

Alumnus James "Babe" Brown was the interim athletic director and basketball coach during the war, then led the Vandals football program in 1945 and 1946, compiling records of 1–7 and 1–8. He returned to the high school ranks in southern Idaho and later coached at the College of Idaho. Dixie Howell, a former star running back at Alabama under Frank Thomas, was hired as head football coach at Idaho in February 1947, and guided the usually-struggling Vandals to a promising 4–4 record in his first season in Moscow, the Vandals' best since 1938. The Vandals beat Stanford on the road, a team that had defeated them 45–0 the previous year (but went winless in 1947). It was Idaho's second-ever football victory over a PCC team from California, following a victory over first-year UCLA in 1928. The Vandals also knocked off an undefeated Utah in the season finale in Boise. The Vandals drew a Palouse and state record crowd to Neale Stadium for their annual rivalry game with Washington State ("the Battle of the Palouse") in October, albeit a close 7–0 loss to the Cougars. These promising factors earned Howell a two-year contract extension through 1950. The progress did not continue, as the Vandals opened the 1948 season with four losses and went 3–6 overall and 1–5 in conference, defeating only Montana for the Little Brown Stein. Idaho played Washington State close at Rogers Field in Pullman and gave a scare to Oregon, who would be co-champions that year. Howell's relationship with Idaho fans and the administration was strained following the 1949 season. The Vandals went 3–5 and 1–4 in conference that season, defeating only departing Montana again. Their two non-conference wins were against overmatched opponents Willamette and Portland, and the Vandals were severely outscored 230–45 in their five losses, capped by a 63–0 loss at Stanford to end the season. Howell felt compelled to publicly deny rumors in April that he would leave before the 1950 season; the Vandals went 3–5–1 record (1–1–1 in conference), and Howell's contract was not renewed in March 1951.

Assistant coach Raymond "Babe" Curfman remained on campus as interim head coach for the upcoming 1951 spring drills after Howell's departure. The administration was impressed with his handling of the team during the first week of practice and made him the permanent head coach in mid-April. He guided the Vandals for three seasons in the Pacific Coast Conference and compiled a 7–19–1 (.278) record. His salary in his final year at Idaho in 1953 was $7,920. Curfman and the Vandals made headlines during the 1953 season as Idaho struggled in conference play in the PCC. The Vandals had finished the 1953 season at 1–8 under Curfman. Curfman resigned as Idaho's head coach in December 1953. Skip Stahley, former head football coach at Toledo, returned to college football in February 1954 as the head coach of the Vandals at an annual salary of $9,000. Stahley compiled a 22–51–1 (.304) record in eight seasons in Moscow. While on the Palouse, he coached future NFL notables Jerry Kramer, Wayne Walker, Jim Prestel, and AFL all-star Jim Norton. The Vandals were members of the Pacific Coast Conference for Stahley's first five seasons, then played as an independent when the conference disbanded. Idaho's only conference victory under Stahley came in his first season: the winless Vandals (0–5) surprised and shut out rival Washington State 10–0 in Pullman in the Battle of the Palouse in 1954. It was Idaho's first victory in football over the Cougars in 29 years, and the subsequent march by WSC students from Pullman to Moscow was featured in Life magazine: The win started a four-game winning streak, Idaho's longest in 31 years, to finish at 4–5 for the 1954 season. The Vandals waited a full decade before they beat the Cougars again, in 1964. When Idaho athletic director Bob Gibb left in 1960, Stahley took over those duties in July for four years. He handled both jobs for a year and a half, then stepped down under pressure as football coach in January 1962, but remained as athletic director until mid-1964.

Illinois assistant coach Dee Andros became head coach of the Vandals at age 37 in February 1962, and his starting annual salary was just under $12,500. Andros served in the U.S. Marines during World War II and saw action at Iwo Jima; he later played on the line at Oklahoma under Bud Wilkinson. The 1962 team was 2–6–1, but the following year he led Idaho to its first winning season (5–4) in a quarter century. The tenth and final game of the 1963 season, a road game at Arizona State on November 23 was canceled, following the assassination of President John F. Kennedy. The Vandals won their opener in 1964, but then lost four straight, the latter two were close ones to Oregon and Oregon State. The 10–7 loss to the Rose Bowl-bound Beavers in Corvallis came by a late third quarter OSU punt return. The Vandals rebounded and the next week won the Battle of the Palouse for the first time in a decade, defeating neighbor Washington State 28–13. The Cougars were led by first-year head coach Bert Clark, a former Sooner teammate of Andros. The Vandals split the final four games to finish at 4–6. While Idaho had joined Division I-AA and the Big Sky Conference as a charter member in 1963, the Vandals remained an independent for football through 1964 under Andros. Only one conference foe was played during the first two Big Sky seasons, a 1963 game with Idaho State that was previously scheduled. Andros spent three seasons at Idaho, with an overall record of 11–16–1.

Steve Musseau, an assistant coach for the Vandals and previously at Orange Coast College, was selected as the next Vandals head coach in 1965. Musseau's 1965 team, with fullback Ray McDonald, won the Battle of the Palouse over Washington State for the second straight year, this time on the road in Pullman, and finished at 5–5. Although Idaho was a charter member was the Big Sky Conference in 1963, it had only played one conference game in football in the first two seasons, a previously scheduled game against Idaho State. Idaho was a "university division" program and a longtime member of the defunct PCC, while the other four football-playing members of the Big Sky were "college division" (Division II). Under Andros, Idaho viewed the six-team Big Sky as an answer to its basketball scheduling problems, as well as other sports, but had desired to continue as an independent at the top level in football. Directed by the conference to comply, Idaho played its first full conference schedule in football in 1965 and was 3–1 for the first two seasons, but posted a disappointing 2–2 in the third. A November defeat at Weber State and non-conference blowout losses at Washington State (14–52) and Houston (6–77) closed out the 1967 season at 4–6 overall. Although his 13–17 (.433) record was better than each of the previous eight head coaches, pressure from alumni and boosters forced Musseau's resignation, despite a signed petition by the Vandal football players that he remain for a fourth year. His salary during his final year as head coach was $13,900.

Coach Y C McNease succeeded Musseau as the Vandals' head football coach and placed a new emphasis on the passing game; the 1968 Vandals were 5–5 (3–1 in Big Sky), but the next year the team struggled with injuries and slipped to 2–8 with only one win in conference in 1969. After just two seasons in Moscow, McNease was dismissed as head coach in May 1970 following spring practices. Though reasons were not fully disclosed by the university, it was attributed to his disciplinary tactics and player unrest. Additionally, an altercation reportedly occurred with a player in a Memorial Gym hallway and resulted in a ripped coat. Several months after his dismissal, McNease filed a $1 million breach of contract lawsuit in U.S. District Court against the University of Idaho. An out-of-court settlement was reached in 1973 for just under $24,800. When McNease was dismissed after spring drills in May 1970, Don Robbins was promoted from an assistant coach to head coach of the Vandals. His 1971 team had the best record (8–3) in the history of the school, but the next two seasons were less successful and he was dismissed in November 1973.

After Robbins' departure, the Idaho athletics administration turned to yet another Vandals assistant coach to fill its head coaching vacancy. Ed Troxel, who had served as an assistant coach of the staffs of Musseau, McNease and Robbins, was promoted to the position of head coach. Troxel had turned down the head football job in May 1970 and again in December 1973, but later accepted after persuasion from his players and concessions from the new athletic director, namely a fourth assistant coach. His annual salary for the first season in 1974 was $16,500, which was $1,500 less than his predecessor Don Robbins. One of Troxel's notable hires was his first offensive coordinator, a 27-year-old Dennis Erickson, who was hired away from Montana State and stayed for two seasons. His replacement was Jack Elway, recently at WSU, but Elway left in March after just five weeks on staff to become a Division II head coach in southern California at Cal State Northridge. Despite this turnover at OC before Troxel's third season in 1976, the Vandals went 7–4 (5–1 in the Big Sky), with center John Yarno selected as a Division I first-team AP All-American. At the time, it was the Vandals' second best football record in history, surpassed only by the 1971 team at 8–3. With key players lost to graduation and beset by injuries, Idaho fell to 3–8 in 1977 and five weeks later, on December 30, Troxel was asked to resign by new UI president Richard Gibb. The involuntary resignation ended Troxel's four years as head coach and 11 football seasons at the university.

=== Jerry Davitch era (1978–1981) ===
The Vandals finally turned to a coach from outside the Idaho program to hire its 25th head coach, choosing Air Force offensive line coach Jerry Davitch. Davitch was a relatively inexperienced coach, he had served as a high school head coach from 1969 to 1972 at Salpointe Catholic High School in Tucson, Arizona and as a position coach under Ben Martin at Air Force for five years; from 1973 to 1975 as wide receivers coach and as offensive line coach from 1976 to 1977. Davitch's annual salary in 1978 was $26,000. Davitch hired Bill Tripp as offensive coordinator and retained defensive coordinator Greg McMackin from Ed Troxel's staff. At the time, the Idaho football program had posted just four winning seasons in over four decades, and the last four head coaches had been fired after three or four seasons. In addition, no Vandal head football coach had left with a winning record since 1928.

Davitch retained the veer option on offense, but the progress was slow in his first two seasons. In 1978, the Vandals finished 2–9. They began the season by losing their first five games; a 31–14 loss to I-A opponent San Jose State, a 28–0 shutout to their I-A rival Washington State in the Battle of the Palouse, a 28–6 loss to Wichita State, a 34–29 defeat at the hands of Northern Arizona and a 53–14 blowout by I-A UNLV. Idaho broke through with their first on October 14 with a 34–30 win over rival Montana for the Little Brown Stein. Davitch's team then lost their next three; 57–21 to Montana State, 51–6 to Weber State and 48–10 to in-state archrival Boise State. The Vandals' final win of the 1978 season was an unplayed forfeit by Idaho State for a scheduled night game in Moscow in November. Flying from Pocatello to the Palouse on the afternoon of the game because of unavailable lodging, one of ISU's two chartered Convair 440 aircraft had carburetor problems soon after takeoff and had to land. It carried the defensive players; the other with the offense landed safely at the Moscow-Pullman airport two hours later. After difficulties in arranging a viable makeup date, a forfeit win was awarded to the Vandals. It was the conference finale for both teams, Davitch's squad finished the season with a 41–28 loss to I-A foe Fresno State. After the 1978 season, defensive coordinator Greg McMackin left to join Jack Elway's San Jose State staff as defensive backs coach. Tim Hundley was hired as his replacement.

Idaho finished 4–7 in 1979. They dropped their first two games of the season; a 30–10 loss to I-A Fresno State on September 8 and a 29–18 loss to Northern Arizona on September 15. Davitch's team then won their next three; defeating Pacific (17–13), D-II Puget (34–10), and Idaho State (28–23). After a 41–17 loss to in-state adversary Boise State, Idaho defeated Montana by a score of 20–17 for Little Brown Stein on October 20. The Vandals lost their last four to close the season, losing to Montana State by a count of 28–20, Nevada by a score of 38–26, Weber State to the tune of 12–7 and South Dakota State by a score of 27–13. In 1980, the improving Vandals went 6–5 with redshirt freshman quarterback Ken Hobart, with a 4–3 record in conference play. The "Gold Rush" Vandals were picked as one of the top five teams in Division I-AA by Sports Illustrated before the 1981 season. The Vandals lost close games and then were hit by injuries; they lost their final six games to finish at 3–8 in 1981, winless and in last place in the Big Sky. Davitch compiled a record of 15–29 (.341) in his four seasons in Moscow and became the fifth consecutive head coach to be fired. He was notified nine days before his final game (a 43–45 home loss to rival Boise State, the defending I-AA national champions).

=== Dennis Erickson era (1982–1985) ===
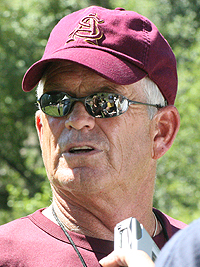
Coach Erickson

On December 11, 1981, San Jose State offensive coordinator Dennis Erickson was named the 26th head football coach of the Idaho Vandals. Erickson had prior ties to the Vandals football program, serving as offensive coordinator under Ed Troxel from 1974 to 1975. He had also served as offensive coordinator at Fresno State from 1976 to 1978 under Jim Sweeney and Bob Padilla and before joining Jack Elway's San Jose State staff in 1979. Erickson was an early pioneer of the spread offense and installed the system when he took over as the Vandals head coach. He hired by UI athletic director Bill Belknap and accepted a one-year contract at $38,001. Both of Erickson's coordinators, offensive coordinator Keith Gilbertson and defensive coordinator John L. Smith, would go on to lead the Vandals football program themselves. Building on his reputation as an offensive innovator, Erickson became Idaho's all-time winningest head coach in just four seasons. He took them to the I-AA playoffs in his first and fourth seasons.

In his first season, Erickson took an underachieving (and injured) 3–8 team in 1981 and immediately turned it into a 9–4 playoff team, led by decathlete quarterback Ken Hobart. The Vandals began the season with a 34–14 loss to Washington State in the Battle of the Palouse. Idaho then won its next four defeating Pacific (36–17), Portland State (56–0), Weber State (35–34) and Northern Iowa (38–13). On October 16, Erickson's team lost Little Brown Stein to Montana by a score of 40–16. Erickson's squad regrouped to win another four in a row, starting with a 36–20 win over Montana State. Next was a 24–17 win over archrival Boise State on October 30. On November 6, Idaho defeated Idaho State by a count of 20–17. Next came a 55–37 win over Northern Arizona before the Vandals lost to Nevada by a score of 25–16. After winning a rematch with Montana by a score of 21–7 in the first round of the 1982 NCAA Division I-AA playoffs, the Vandals lost to Eastern Kentucky in the quarterfinals by a score of 38–30.

The Vandals went 8–3 in 1983. The season kicked off with a 43–28 win over NAIA opponent Southern Colorado on September 10 behind quarterback Ken Hobart's I-AA record setting performance of 37 of 59 for 527 passing yards and six touchdown passes. The Vandals then shut out Montana State by a score of 23–0. After a 41–31 loss to Idaho State Idaho defeated Eastern Washington (38–24) and Portland State (17–16). After a 28–10 loss to Weber State, Idaho went on a three-game win streak; defeating Montana for the Little Brown Stein by a score of 45–24, Pacific by a score of 31–19 and Northern Arizona by a score of 40–10.

Idaho finished 6–5 in 1984. They began the season with a 49–14 shellacking of Portland State on September 8. The Vandals then dropped their next two; losing to Cal State Fullerton by a count of 28–7 and Montana State by a score of 34–28. Idaho then upset I-A foe Oregon State of the Pac-12 Conference on September 29 by a score of 41–22. Erickson's Vandals embarked upon a three-game losing streak; dropping games to Nevada (23–17), Weber State (40–37), and Eastern Washington (32–25). The Vandals finished the 1984 season with four wins; defeating Montana for the Little Brown Stein by a score of 40–39, Northern Arizona by a score of 37–9, Idaho State by a score of 45–42 and archrival Boise State in a 37–0 shutout.

Erickson led the Vandals to a 9–3 record in 1985. They started the season with a 43–28 loss to Oregon State on September 7 but won their next six; beating D-II Mankato State by a count of 46–7, Northern Arizona by a margin of 27–3, Nevada by a score of 25–21, Portland State by a score of 51–17, Weber State by a margin of 31–28 and Montana for the Little Brown Stein in a 38–0 shutout. After a 38–37 loss to Idaho State on October 26, the Vandals won their next three; defeating Eastern Washington by a count of 42–21, Montana State in a 34–0 shutout and archrival Boise State by a score of 44–27 in the regular season finale. Idaho lost in the first round of the 1985 NCAA Division I-AA Playoffs in a rematch with Eastern Washington by a score of 42–38.

Erickson's overall record with the Vandals was 32–15 (.681), 31–13 (.705) in the regular season and 1–2 in the post season. He went 4–0 against archrival Boise State, a team which had dominated the series by winning the previous five games. (The winning streak against the Broncos reached 12 games; it was broken in 1994 when BSU advanced to the I-AA finals.) His most notable recruits at Idaho were his quarterbacks – future NFL head coach Scott Linehan, who had future Vandals head coach Tom Cable blocking for him, and future College Football Hall of Famer John Friesz, who had Mark Schlereth blocking for him. Erickson revived Vandal football and quickly turned it into a top I-AA program, but he wouldn't stick around. Erickson departed after the 1985 season to accept the head coaching position at Wyoming. From there, Erickson had successful head coaching tenures at Washington State and Miami before serving as a head coach with the NFL's Seattle Seahawks and San Francisco 49ers. He also served as head coach at Oregon State and Arizona State, and would return for a second stint with the Vandals in 2006.

=== Keith Gilbertson era (1986–1988) ===
After Erickson's departure, Idaho promoted offensive coordinator Keith Gilbertson to head coach. Gilbertson had served as a graduate assistant at three schools: Idaho State from 1971 to 1974, Western Washington in 1975 and Washington in 1976 before joining Bruce Snyder's staff at Utah State as offensive coordinator, a position he held from 1977 to 1981 before joining Erickson's staff at Idaho as offensive coordinator in 1982. Gilbertson hired Bill Diedrick and Kent Baer as his offensive and defensive coordinators. As a result of his personal roots in Washington and his years as an assistant coach in both states, Gilbertson had extensive recruiting ties in Washington and Idaho. In his three seasons in Moscow as head coach, Gilbertson's win–loss record was 28–9 (.757).

In Gilbertson's first season, the Vandals finished with an 8–4 record. They began the season with a 42–10 win over NCAA Division II opponent Portland State. After losing to I-A opponent Central Michigan by a score of 34–21, Gilbertson's squad defeated Cal State Fullerton by a count of 25–17 on September 20. The Vandals followed that victory with two more wins; a 27–10 win over Eastern Washington and a 38–26 win over Idaho State. The Vandals lost their next two games; a 23–17 defeat at the hands of Nevada and a 24–0 shutout at the hands of Northern Arizona. Idaho finished off the regular season by reeling off four straight wins; 38–31 over Montana, 44–17 over Montana State, 31–17 over Weber State and 21–14 over archrival Boise State. Gilbertson's Vandals lost in the first round of the 1986 NCAA Division I-AA football playoffs in a rematch with Nevada by a score of 27–7 on November 29.

Idaho went 9–3 in 1987. They began the season on September 5, defeating Minnesota State by a score of 31–17. After a 30–18 loss to I-A opponent Central Michigan, the Vandals won their next two, defeating D-II opponent Portland State by a count of 17–10 and Northern Arizona by a count of 46–37. After a 30–21 loss to Idaho State on October 3, the Vandals won their last six games of the regular season; defeating Montana by a score of 31–25 in the Little Brown Stein rivalry game, Nevada by a score of 38–28, Eastern Washington by a score of 31–24, Weber State by a score of 41–38, Montana State by a score of 14–7 and rival Boise State by a score of 40–34 behind redshirt sophomore quarterback John Friesz's 423 passing yards and four touchdown passes. The Vandals lost in the first round of the 1987 NCAA Division I-AA Playoffs to Weber State by a score of 59–30.

The Vandals posted their best record under Gilbertson in 1988, finishing 11–2. The season began on September 10 with a 27–18 win over Portland State. The next week, they defeated Pacific by a score of 36–26. After a 26–17 loss to Montana, Idaho won their next nine; 31–20 over Northern Arizona, 41–24 over Montana State, 31–22 over Eastern Washington, 27–24 over Weber State, 32–31 over Nevada after overcoming an 18-point deficit in the fourth quarter, 41–7 over Idaho State, 26–20 over archrival Boise State in the regular season finale, 38–19 in a rematch with Montana in the first round of the 1988 NCAA Division I-AA Playoffs and 38–30 over Northwestern State in the quarterfinal round of the playoffs. Gilbertson's team fell short in the national semifinal round, losing by a score of 38–7 to Furman on December 10. Following consecutive conference championships and advancing to the Division I-AA national semifinals, Gilbertson interviewed for the UTEP head coaching position in December 1988 but withdrew from consideration. Days later on Christmas Eve, he accepted an offer to coach the offensive line in the Pac-10 at Washington in Seattle, Washington under head coach Don James and offensive coordinator Gary Pinkel.

=== John L. Smith era (1989–1994) ===
Washington State defensive coordinator John L. Smith was hired to replace Keith Gilbertson. A native of Idaho Falls, Idaho, Smith had prior ties to the Vandals football program, serving as defensive coordinator for the Vandals from 1982 to 1985 under Dennis Erickson. Smith, who had no prior head coaching experience, also served as defensive coordinator at Nevada from 1977 to 1981 under Chris Ault and at Wyoming (1986) and Washington State (1987–1988) under Erickson. Smith posted a 53–21 record (.716) in six seasons as the head coach at Idaho. Under his leadership, the Vandals won two Big Sky conference championships and made the 16-team NCAA Division I-AA playoffs five times, advancing to the national semifinals in 1993. Smith's 53 wins are the most in school history. His starting annual salary at Idaho was under $60,000, but in 1991 he became the first UI head coach to be granted a multi-year contract.

Smith inherited an 11–2 team from Keith Gilbertson that had made the I-AA semifinals in 1988, and returned All-American quarterback in John Friesz. The Vandals finished 9–3 in 1989. They lost their first two games of the 1989 season to Washington State (41–7) and Portland State (29–20). The Vandals then won their next nine to close the regular season, topping Sacramento State by a score of 45–3, Weber State by a score of 46–33, Montana to the tune of 30–24, Northern Arizona by a margin of 41–31 behind John Friesz's five touchdown passes, Montana State by a count of 41–7 behind Friesz's 340 passing yards and two touchdown passes, Eastern Washington by a competitive 41–34 score, Nevada by a count of 42–22, Idaho State by a score of 47–31 and archrival Boise State by a competitive score of 26–21 in the regular season finale. Smith's team lost in the first round of the 1989 NCAA Division I-AA Playoffs, falling in a 38–21 contest to Eastern Illinois on November 25. Idaho went undefeated (8–0) in conference play in 1989, the only time in school history. Friesz won the Walter Payton Award after the 1989 season, was drafted in the sixth round with the 138th overall pick in the 1990 NFL draft by the San Diego Chargers, and spent a decade playing in the NFL.

Idaho finished 9–4 in 1990. They began the season with a 27–24 loss to Montana State. After defeating Texas State by a score of 38–35, the Vandals lost to I-A opponent Oregon by a blowout score of 55–23. Smith's squad then defeated Weber State by a score of 37–27 and lost to Nevada by a margin of 31–28. The Vandals then embarked upon a seven-game winning streak, defeating Chico State by a margin of 59–21, Idaho State by a count of 41–20, Eastern Washington by a score of 51–28, Northern Arizona by a blowout score of 52–7, Montana by a score of 35–14 for the Little Brown Stein, and rival Boise State by a margin of 21–14 in the regular season finale. Idaho defeated Missouri State by a score of 41–35 in the first round of the 1990 NCAA Division I-AA Playoffs but were beaten by Georgia Southern in the quarterfinals by a score of 28–27.

The Vandals went 6–5 in 1991. Smith led his team to three victories to start the season; 49–7 over Sonoma State, 41–38 over Texas State and 48–14 over Montana State. The Vandals then lost their next three; dropping contests to Northern Iowa (36–14), Nevada (31–23) and Weber State (45–17). Smith's Vandals alternated between win and loss for the remainder of the season; defeating Idaho State by a score of 46–21, losing a close contest to Eastern Washington by a count of 34–31, beating Northern Arizona by a margin of 44–28, losing a 35–34 nail biter to Montana for the Little Brown Stein and defeating adversary Boise State by a count of 28–24.

The Idaho Vandals compiled a 9–3 record in 1992. They jumped out of the gate to win their first six of the season, defeating St. Cloud State by a margin of 42–9, I-A opponent Colorado State by a margin of 37–34, Weber State by a margin of 52–24, Cal State Northridge by a margin of 30–7, Idaho State by a margin of 49–18 and Eastern Washington by a margin of 38–21. Smith's squad suffered its first loss of the season in their seventh game, a 27–26 defeat to Northern Iowa. After a 53–14 blowout win over Northern Arizona, the Vandals lost the Little Brown Stein to Montana by a margin of 47–29. Smith's team closed the regular season with two wins; a 28–7 triumph over Montana State and a 62–16 shellacking of in-state archrival Boise State. Idaho lost in the first round of the 1992 NCAA Division I-AA Playoffs to McNeese State by a margin of 23–20.

Idaho went 11–3 in 1993. For the second consecutive year, the Vandals won their first six games of the season; topping Stephen F. Austin by a score of 38–30, Texas State by a count of 66–38, Weber State in a shutout by a blowout score of 56–0, I-A foe Utah by a count of 28–17, Idaho State by a margin of 56–27 and Eastern Washington by a margin of 49–10. Smith's team suffered its first defeat of the season on October 23 with a 40–35 loss to Montana State. On October 30, Idaho defeated Northern Arizona by a score of 34–27. That was followed with a 54–34 loss to Montana on November 6. The Vandals set a school record for points scored in a game with a 77–14 win over Lehigh on November 13. The Vandals routed Boise State in a 49–16 victory in the regular season finale on November 20. Smith led the Vandals to two wins in the 1993 NCAA Division I-A Playoffs, defeating Louisiana-Monroe by a score of 34–31 in the first round and Boston University by a score of 21–14 in the quarterfinal round. The Vandals fell short in the semifinal round, losing to Youngstown State by a score of 35–16. Quarterback Doug Nussmeier, who threw for over 10,000 yards during his college career and won the Walter Payton Award in 1993; was selected in the fourth round with the 116th overall pick in the 1994 NFL draft by the New Orleans Saints.

The Vandals finished 9–3 in 1994. Smith's team began the season 7–0; defeating Southern Utah (43–10), I-A opponent UNLV (48–38), Stephen F. Austin (58–26), Idaho State (70–21), Eastern Washington (40–15), Montana State (27–13) and Northern Arizona (41–14). Idaho suffered its first loss of the season on October 29 in their annual matchup with Montana for the Little Brown Stein, falling to the Grizzlies by a score of 45–21. After defeating Northern Iowa by a score of 21–12 on November 5, the Vandals broke their school record for points scored in a single game they set one year earlier when they defeated Weber State by an astonishing 79–30. Idaho lost to Boise State, by a margin of 27–24 to end Idaho's 12-game winning streak in the rivalry series. The Vandals lost to McNeese State in the first round of the 1994 NCAA Division I-AA Playoffs by a score of 23–20 on November 26. Smith left Idaho after the 1994 season for I-A school Utah State, where he would serve as head coach from 1995 to 1997, and later led the football programs at Louisville (1998–2002), Michigan State (2003–2006), and Arkansas (2012).

=== Chris Tormey era (1995–1999) ===
Washington defensive coordinator Chris Tormey was named as Smith's replacement and his starting annual salary in 1995 was $71,868. Tormey had prior ties to the Vandals football program, playing defensive end and outside linebacker for the Vandals from 1973 to 1977 under Don Robbins and Ed Troxel and serving as defensive line coach for the Vandals from 1982 to 1983 under Dennis Erickson. Though he had no head coaching experience, Tormey had served ten years as an assistant coach at Washington under Don James and Jim Lambright. In his five seasons at the helm in Moscow, Tormey compiled a 33–23 record, On December 22, 1994, it was announced that the University of Idaho would leave I-AA and the Big Sky Conference and return to I-A football as members of the Big West Conference effective July 1, 1996.

The Vandals finished 6–5 in 1995. Tormey's team lost its first game of the season by a score of 14–7 to I-A opponent Oregon State After a 66–3 drubbing of D-II Sonoma State, Idaho lost their next two; dropping contests to Idaho State (26–21) and Montana State (16–13). The Vandals rebounded to win their next two; topping Eastern Washington by a score of 37–10 and Montana for the Little Brown Stein by a margin of 55–43. After a 25–19 loss to Weber State, the Vandals won their last three games of the regular season; defeating Northern Arizona by a count of 17–14, Northern Iowa by a score of 16–12 and archrival Boise State by a margin of 33–13. The Idaho Vandals fell short in the first round of the 1995 NCAA Division I-AA Playoffs, losing to McNeese State by a score of 33–3.

Tormey led Idaho to a second straight 6–5 record in 1996, their first season back in I-A and as members of the Big West Conference. The Vandals started the season on August 31 with a close 40–38 loss to Wyoming. That was followed by a 40–21 loss to San Diego State on September 7. They recorded their first win of the season in their third game against St. Mary's with a 52–17 drubbing. After losing Texas State by a score of 27–21, the Vandals won two in a row; defeating Cal Poly by a margin of 38–33 and Nevada by a margin of 24–15. After a 35–28 loss to former head coach John L. Smith and Utah State, the Vandals defeated I-AA Eastern Washington by a margin of 37–27 and New Mexico State by a margin of 34–19. After a 24–17 loss to North Texas on November 16, the Vandals demolished Boise State by an astonishing 64–19.

Idaho went 5–6 in 1997. A 14–10 loss to Air Force on August 30 kicked off the season. Then, the Vandals recorded consecutive shutouts, demolishing I-AA opponents Portland State 46–0 and Idaho State 43–0. After a humbling 41–10 loss to UCF on September 20, Idaho defeated North Texas by a count of 30–17 and I-AA UC-Davis by a count of 44–14. Tormey's team suffered a three-game losing streak; falling to Nevada by a score of 42–23 on October 18, Utah State by a score of 63–17 on October 25 and I-AA Eastern Washington by a count of 24–21. After defeating New Mexico State by a margin of 35–18, Idaho lost to in-state adversary Boise State by a margin of 30–23 in overtime after blowing a 23–6 lead third quarter lead.

In 1998, the Vandals' made their first-ever bowl appearance in the Humanitarian Bowl, a 42–35 victory over 16-point favorite Southern Miss. The Vandals earned the bowl berth by winning the Big West title with a dramatic one-point overtime win over rival Boise State, on the road in Bronco Stadium in Boise. (Although this was Idaho's 15th win in the last 17 games in this rivalry, the 1998 win remains their most recent over BSU.) The bowl victory propelled Idaho to an impressive 9–3 record in 1998, their third season back in Division I-A, and Tormey was named coach of the year in the Big West. Before the season, the Sporting News had Idaho ranked last of 112 teams in Division I-A. Tormey interviewed in early January for the open head coaching position at Washington in Seattle which eventually went to Rick Neuheisel. Tormey also interviewed for the head coaching position at Oregon State, which eventually hired former Vandals head coach Dennis Erickson to replace Mike Riley.

The Vandals went 7–4 in 1999. They began the season with a 48–21 win over I-AA foe Eastern Washington. After losing to Auburn by a score of 30–23, earned a 28–17 win over neighboring Washington State. It was Idaho's first football victory over WSU in 34 years, breaking the Cougars' 14-game winning streak in the lopsided series. The next week, Idaho lost to Wyoming by a score of 28–13. Then, Idaho won its next three; defeating North Texas by a score of 28–10, Arkansas State by a score of 30–24 and Utah State by a score of 31–3. After losing by a score of 42–14 to New Mexico State, the Vandals won their next two; beating Nevada 42–33 and I-AA opponent Montana 33–30. Tormey's squad finished the 1999 season with a 45–14 loss to in-state rival Boise State. Following the 1999 season, Tormey left his alma mater to become head coach at Nevada.

=== Tom Cable era (2000–2003) ===
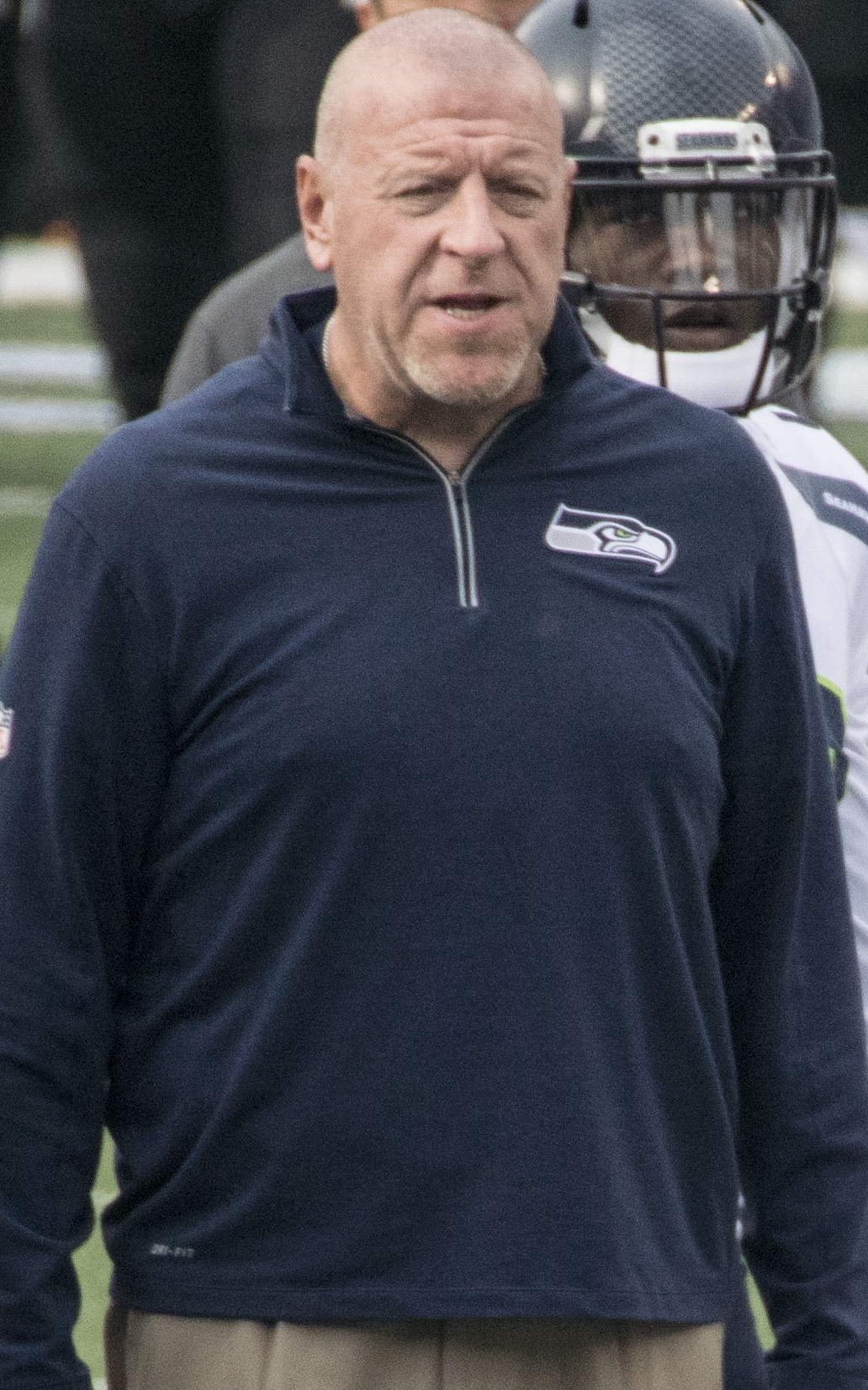
Coach Cable

On December 14, 1999, Colorado offensive coordinator Tom Cable was named the Vandals 30th head football coach. Cable played offensive lineman for the Vandals from 1983 to 1986 under Dennis Erickson and Keith Gilbertson and served as a graduate assistant from 1987 to 1988 under Gilbertson. After serving another stint as a graduate assistant at San Diego State for one year in 1989, Cable went on to serve as an assistant coach at Cal State Fullerton, UNLV and California before joining Rick Neuheisel's staff at Colorado in 1998 and being promoted to offensive coordinator the following year by new head coach Gary Barnett. He signed a three-year contract at $170,000 per year ($120,000 base and $50,000 media bonus) plus $30,000 in incentives.

Cable's first year, 2000, was his best, with a 5–6 record. The Vandals kicked off the season with a 44–20 loss to No. 14 Washington on September 2. The following week, Idaho lost to I-AA opponent Montana by a score of 45–38. That was followed by a 42–13 loss to Oregon on September 16. Cable's team earned its first win of the season the next week by defeating their rivals from eight miles down the road, a 38–34 win over Washington State. The next week, the Vandals defeated I-AA foe Montana State by a whopping 56–7. On October 7, Idaho lost to West Virginia by a score of 28–16. Idaho recorded its third win of the season the next week by defeating Arkansas State 42–25. After losing to Utah State by a score of 31–14, Cable's Vandals won their next two; beating North Texas 16–14 on November 4 and New Mexico State 44–41 on November 11. The Vandals closed the season with a 66–24 loss to their in-state rivals, Boise State, on November 18.

In 2001, the University of Idaho joined the Sun Belt Conference as a football-only member (they joined the conference in all sports in 2003). That year, the football team finished 1–10. They lost their first eight games of the season; a 36–7 thumping by their rival Washington State, a 36–29 loss to Arizona, a 53–3 blowout loss to No. 13 Washington, a 45–13 loss to their bitter rival Boise State, a 70–58 loss to Middle Tennessee in which the teams compiled 1,445 yards of total offense set an NCAA Division I scoring record for most points scored in a game, a 46–39 loss to New Mexico State, a 57–34 disappointment to Louisiana–Lafayette and a 34–31 loss to Arkansas State. On November 3, the Vandals finally broke through with their first win of the season, defeating Louisiana-Monroe by a score of 42–38. The next week, Cable's team lost to North Texas by a score of 50–27. They finished the 2001 season with an embarrassing 33–27 loss to I-AA Montana on November 24 in a game that had been rescheduled from September due to the terrorist attacks of September 11, 2001.

The Vandals finished 2–10 in 2002. They began the season with a 38–21 loss to their in-state adversary Boise State. The next week, Idaho faced its other rival, No. 11 Washington State and lost by a score of 49–14. Idaho dropped to 0–3 the following week after a 58–21 lopsided loss to No. 13 Oregon. Cable's team notched their first win of the season on September 21 with a 48–38 victory over San Diego State. The Vandals fell to No. 13 Washington in a 41–27 defeat on September 28. That was followed by another loss to I-AA Montana to the tune of 38–31, their second straight year losing to the I-AA Grizzlies. After a 34–14 loss to Louisiana-Monroe on October 12, the Vandals got their second win of the season on October 26, topping Middle Tennessee by a score of 21–18. Following a 31–28 loss to Louisiana–Lafayette, the Vandals lost a 10–0 defensive struggle to North Texas. Cable's Vandals finished the season with a 38–29 loss to Arkansas State and a 35–31 loss to New Mexico State.

Idaho finished 3–9 in 2003. They were shut out by Washington State to the tune of 25–0 in the season's opening game. An ugly 8–5 loss to I-AA opponent Eastern Washington followed on September 6. The struggles didn't stop there, as the Vandals lost to their heated in-state rival Boise State by a score of 24–10. Then came a 45–14 loss to No. 19 Washington followed by yet another loss to I-AA foe Montana to the tune of 41–28. On October 4, Cable's Vandals broke through and won their first game of the season with a 35–31 victory over New Mexico State. Idaho then lost their next four; falling to North Texas (24–14), Middle Tennessee (28–21), Louisiana–Lafayette (31–20) and Arkansas State (24–23). The Vandals finished the season on a high note; winning their last two over Louisiana-Monroe (58–20) and Utah State (20–13). Following the 2003 season, Cable became the first Idaho head football coach fired in 22 years when he was dismissed by newly hired athletics director Rob Spear. Cable's four predecessors had all achieved success in with the Vandals and moved on. He left with a disappointing record of 11–35 (.239) in four losing seasons.

=== Nick Holt era (2004–2005) ===
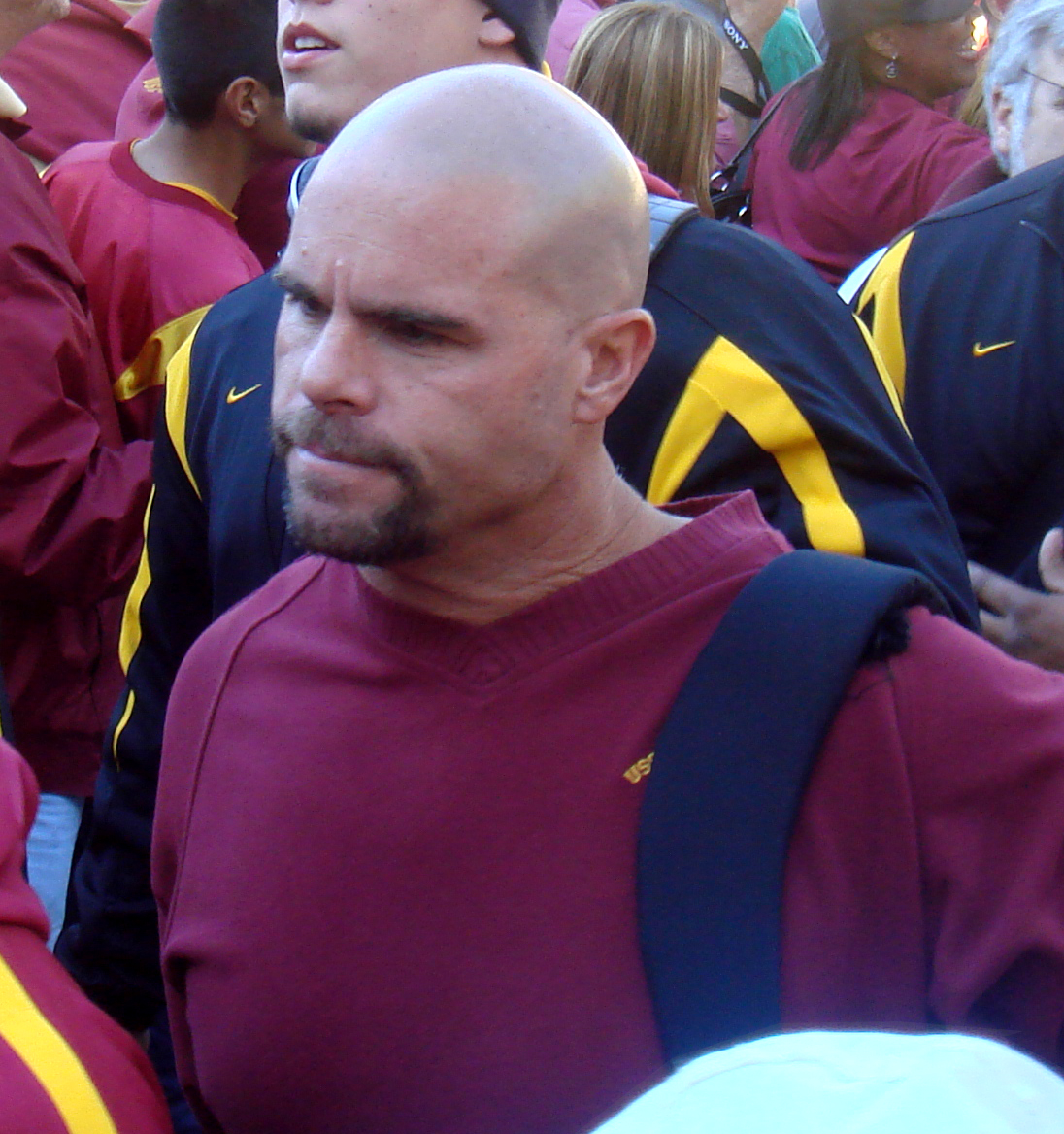
Coach Holt

USC linebackers coach Nick Holt was hired to replace Tom Cable, becoming the Vandals' 31st head football coach. Holt spent nine years at Idaho as an assistant coach (defensive line coach, 1990–1993; defensive coordinator, 1994–1997) under John L. Smith and Chris Tormey. From 2001 to 2003, Holt served as linebackers coach at USC under Pete Carroll and helped develop the likes of Lofa Tatupu, Darnell Bing, Collin Ashton and others who helped the Trojans capture the 2003 national championship and begin their run of dominance under Carroll in the 2000s. Holt signed a four-year contract with Idaho that paid him $205,000 per year. On June 4, 2004, it was announced that the University of Idaho would leave the Sun Belt Conference and join the more geographically friendly Western Athletic Conference (WAC) beginning in fall 2005.

The Vandals went 3–9 in 2004, which was their last season in the Sun Belt Conference. They began the Holt era by losing to archrival Boise State by a score of 65–7 on September 4. The following week, they fell to Utah State by a score of 14–7. Idaho faced Pac-10 opponents over the next two weeks, losing to rival Washington State by a score of 49–8 and Oregon by another lopsided score of 48–10. Holt earned his first win as a head coach and the Vandals earned their first win of the season on October 2 with a 45–41 win over Eastern Michigan. After losing a tight game by a score of 16–14 to Louisiana-Monroe, Holt's squad defeated Louisiana–Lafayette by a more comfortable 38–25. They then lost to Middle Tennessee by a score of 34–14 and Troy in a blowout 47–7. After defeating Arkansas State by a score of 45–31, the Vandals lost to North Texas (51–29) and Hawaii (52–21). During the 2004 season, in September, redshirt freshman cornerback Eric McMillan was shot and killed outside his on-campus apartment after a dispute with two Seattle acquaintances. The two suspects were convicted and sentenced to 8–20 years in prison.

Idaho finished 2–9 in 2005, their first season in the WAC. They kicked off the season against the Cougars, losing by a score of 38–26. On September 10, the Vandals lost to UNLV by a score of 34–31. After losing to Washington in by a lopsided 34–6, Holt's team was shut out by Hawaii to the tune of 24–0. On October 1, Idaho earned its first win of the season with a 27–13 victory over Utah State. They then got blown out by Nevada to the tune of 62–14 and No. 24 Fresno State by a score of 40–10. Idaho picked up its second win of the season on October 29 with a thrilling 38–37 double overtime win over New Mexico State. After losing a close 41–38 game to Louisiana Tech, Holt's squad lost to archrival Boise State in a 70–35 shellacking and San Jose State by a score of 26–18. During Holt's short tenure as head football coach at Idaho, a game was scheduled between the Vandals and his former Trojans for September 1, 2007, at the Los Angeles Coliseum in Los Angeles. Holt decided to take the offer to play the game for a few reasons: it offered the Idaho Vandals an opportunity to increase program visibility to recruits in the region, it gave the Vandals a rare chance to play on national television and get national exposure, and the University of Idaho would receive $600,000 from the University of Southern California for the appearance. However, despite a contract that ran through the 2008 season, Holt departed after just two seasons and a 5–18 record to rejoin Pete Carroll's staff at USC to serve as defensive coordinator/defensive line coach for the Trojans, 19 months before the game between the Vandals and the Trojans was to be played.

=== Erickson's return (2006) ===
On February 8, 2006, in a surprise turn of events, it was announced that Dennis Erickson had been rehired as the Vandals head coach after Nick Holt's departure. Almost immediately, news of Erickson's rehiring resulted in boosts in ticket sales and booster donations to the football program. When asked at his (re)introductory press conference if Idaho was indeed a long-term arrangement, Erickson responded, "You want to look at the age on my driver's license?...This, hopefully, is going to be my last job." Erickson hired Dan Cozzetto as offensive coordinator and Jeff Mills as defensive coordinator, while retaining the entire defensive staff he inherited from Nick Holt. Erickson signed a five-year contract worth about $1.5 million with performance bonuses that could've pushed the total to as much as about $2.5 million.

Erickson's rejuvenated 2006 Vandals broke to a 4–3 record and were and 3–0 in the WAC, then lost their final five conference games to finish at 4–8 overall and sixth in the WAC. Erickson's squad started the season with a 27–17 loss to Michigan State and a 56–10 loss to rival Washington State. The Vandals earned their first win of the season on September 16 with a close 27–24 win over I-AA in-state opponent Idaho State. After a 38–0 shutout loss to Oregon State, Idaho won their next three; defeating Utah State 41–21, New Mexico State 28–20 and Louisiana Tech 24–14. However, Erickson's squad lost its last five games of the regular season; dropping contests to archrival No. 18 Boise State by a score of 42–26, Hawaii by a whopping 68–10, Nevada by a score of 45–7, Fresno State in a shutout 34–0 and San Jose State by a score of 28–13. Erickson did not stay true to his word, as he left the Vandals to accept the position of head coach at Arizona State just one year after returning to Moscow.

=== Robb Akey era (2007–2012) ===
Coach Akey

Washington State defensive coordinator Robb Akey was hired to replace Erickson, and was the first Idaho head coach since Jerry Davitch without previous ties to the Vandals football program, either as a former player or coach. However, Akey had familiarity with the program, as he lived eight miles from the University of Idaho campus for eight seasons, with Idaho as an opponent in each of those seasons. In addition, Akey either played or coached against the Vandals for a dozen seasons (1984–1995), while a player and assistant coach in the Big Sky Conference.

Idaho went 1–11 in 2007. Akey's team kicked off the season against No. 1 USC, losing by a score of 38–10. After defeating I-AA opponent Cal Poly by a score of 20–13, the Vandals lost their ten games of the season; falling to rival Washington State by a score of 45–28, Northern Illinois by a score of 42–35, No. 19 Hawaii by a score of 48–20 (despite intercepting Hawaii quarterback Colt Brennan five times), San Jose State by a score of 28–20, Fresno State by a score of 37–24, New Mexico State by a score of 45–31, Nevada by a score of 37–21, Louisiana Tech by a score of 28–16, archrival No. 17 Boise State by a score of 58–14 and Utah State by a score of 24–19.

The Vandals finished 2–10 in 2008. They kicked off the season with a blowout loss, a 70–0 shutout at the hands of Arizona on August 30. Akey's team rebounded the following week to defeat in-state I-AA opponent Idaho State by a score of 42–27 and break its 11-game losing streak dating back to the previous season. The Vandals would then lose their next six; beginning with a 51–28 loss to Western Michigan on September 13. Next was a 42–17 loss to Utah State and a 45–17 loss to San Diego State. Idaho lost to Nevada by a score of 49–14 on October 4. Losses to Fresno State (45–32) and Louisiana Tech (46–14) followed before Idaho defeated New Mexico State by a score of 20–14 on October 25. The Vandals closed the season with three losses; 30–24 to San Jose State, 45–10 to archrival No. 9 Boise State and 49–17 to Hawaii.

Akey's team compiled an impressive 8–5 record in 2009. The Vandals started the season with a 21–6 win over New Mexico State. After losing to Washington by a score of 42–23, Idaho won its next five; beating San Diego State (34–20), Northern Illinois (34–31), Colorado State (31–29), San Jose State (29–25) and Hawaii (35–23). Idaho's defense got gashed on October 24, losing to Nevada by a score of 70–45. The following week, Idaho edged Louisiana Tech by a score of 35–34. Akey's squad then lost their next three to close the regular season; dropping games to Fresno State (31–21), archrival No. 6 Boise State (63–25) and Utah State (52–49). The Vandals were offered and accepted a berth in the 2009 Humanitarian Bowl, where they defeated Bowling Green by a score of 43–42. Offensive lineman Mike Iupati was the team's best player that season. He started all 12 games at left guard, played 807 snaps and had 49 knockdowns and 21 pancake blocks. He did not allow a quarterback sack all year and just five defensive players he blocked that season even pressured quarterbacks Nathan Enderle and Brian Reader. On November 24, 2009, Iupati was named one of three finalists for the Outland Trophy, alongside Russell Okung and winner Ndamukong Suh. Iupati was a consensus 2009 All-American and also named first team All-WAC. He was the first Idaho Vandal to receive All-American honors since John Yarno in 1976 and the first All-American from the WAC since Ryan Clady in 2007. Iupati, who was a senior during the 2009 season, was drafted in the first round with the 17th overall pick in the 2010 NFL draft by the San Francisco 49ers. Iupati was the highest selected Idaho Vandal in the NFL draft since Ray McDonald went 13th overall to the Washington Redskins in the 1967 NFL/AFL draft.

On March 15, 2010, it was announced that the University of Idaho administration had given Robb Akey a contract extension and raise. That year, Idaho finished 6–7. They began the season with a 45–0 shutout win over FCS opponent North Dakota. Idaho lost to No. 6 Nebraska by a score of 38–17 on September 11. The Vandals alternated between win and loss over the next five games; defeating UNLV by a score of 30–7, losing to Colorado State by a score of 36–34, beating Western Michigan by a score of 33–13, losing to Louisiana Tech by a score of 48–35 and defeating New Mexico State by a score of 37–14. They then lost their next three; falling to Hawaii 45–10, No. 25 Nevada 63–17 and archrival No. 4 Boise State 52–14. On November 20, Idaho defeated Utah State by a score of 28–6. After losing to Fresno State by a score of 23–20, the Vandals defeated San Jose State by a score of 26–23 to finish the season.

The Idaho Vandals regressed to 2–10 in 2011. They started the season with a 32–15 loss to Bowling Green on September 1. After defeating FCS foe North Dakota by a score of 44–14, the Vandals lost by a score of 37–7 to No. 9 Texas A&M. That was followed by a 48–24 loss to Fresno State on September 24. The Vandals lost to Virginia by a score of 21–20 on October 1. Losses to Louisiana Tech (24–11), New Mexico State (31–24) and Hawaii (16–14) followed before Akey's squad defeated San Jose State by a score of 32–29 on November 5. Idaho finished the 2011 season with three losses; a 42–7 blowout at the hands of BYU on November 12, a 49–42 double overtime loss to Utah State on November 19 and a humbling 56–3 shellacking at the hands of Nevada on December 3.

Idaho finished 1–11 in 2012. They began the year with a 20–3 loss to FCS opponent Eastern Washington on August 30. Next was a 21–13 loss to Bowling Green. Idaho then traveled to Baton Rouge, Louisiana for a showdown against No. 3 LSU, losing to the Tigers by a score of 63–14. After losing a nail biter in overtime to Wyoming by a score of 40–37, the Vandals were shut out by North Carolina in a 66–0 blowout, a game in which the Tar Heels set a school record for points scored in a single game. It was on October 6 that the Vandals finally broke through with their first win of the season, defeating New Mexico State. Idaho then lost to Texas State by a score of 38–7 and Louisiana Tech by a score of 70–28. Akey was fired as Idaho's head coach after the Louisiana Tech game. Akey departed the Vandals with a record of 20–50. Offensive coordinator Jason Gesser was named interim head coach for the season's final four games, all defeats. The Vandals finished the season with losses to San Jose State (42–13), BYU (52–13), UTSA (34–27) and No. 25 Utah State (45–9). In May 2013, Akey filed a lawsuit against the University of Idaho administration, seeking money he felt he was owed from the contract extension he received three years earlier.

=== Paul Petrino era (2013–2021) ===
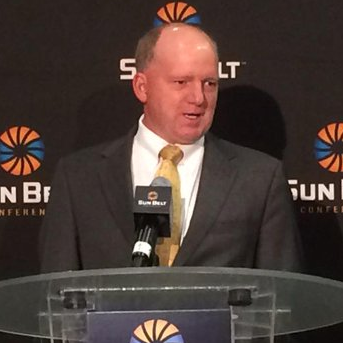
Coach Petrino

On December 2, 2012, Arkansas offensive coordinator Paul Petrino was named the 34th head football coach of the Idaho Vandals. The younger brother of former Atlanta Falcons, Arkansas and Louisville head coach Bobby Petrino, Paul Petrino had ties to the Vandals football program, serving as wide receivers coach under John L. Smith from 1992 to 1994. Arkansas athletic director Jeff Long praised Idaho's hiring of Paul Petrino, saying he would have named Petrino the Arkansas head coach in April 2012 if not for his last name. (Paul's brother, Bobby, was fired due to a scandal stemming from an extramarital affair and John L. Smith was hired instead). A Montana native, Paul Petrino returned to Moscow with a reputation as an offensive mastermind, overseeing a Razorback offense that was among the most explosive in the country and sent a number of players into the National Football League. Petrino, who had no prior head coaching experience, also served as an assistant coach at Utah State (wide receivers/running backs coach/special teams coordinator, 1995–1997), Louisville (wide receivers coach, 1998–1999; offensive coordinator/wide receivers coach, 2003–2006), Southern Miss (quarterbacks coach, 2000–2002), the Atlanta Falcons (wide receivers coach, 2007) and Illinois (offensive coordinator/wide receivers coach, 2010–2011) during his career. He served as offensive coordinator under both his brother (2008–2009) and former Vandals head coach John L. Smith (2012) at Arkansas. Paul Petrino had extensive recruiting ties in the Rocky Mountain region and Southern United States. Petrino's original five-year contract paid him an base salary of $390,000 annually. On March 27, 2013, it was announced that the University of Idaho would rejoin the Sun Belt Conference as a football-only member with all other sports rejoining the Big Sky Conference effective July 1, 2014. The move came after the Western Athletic Conference dropped football as a conference sport following the 2012 season.

The Vandals finished 1–11 in 2013, Idaho's one year as an independent between the end of the Western Athletic Conference and the program's return to the Sun Belt Conference. The Petrino era began on August 31, with a 40–6 loss to North Texas. Next came losses to Wyoming by a score of 42–10, Northern Illinois by a margin of 45–35 and rival Washington State in a 42–0 shutout. The Vandals earned their first win under Paul Petrino with a 26–24 victory over Temple on September 28. The next week, Petrino's team got squashed by No. 23 Fresno State to the tune of 61–14. That was followed by a 48–24 loss to Arkansas State on October 12. On October 26, the Vandals were pummeled by Ole Miss by a margin of 59–14. Next came a 37–21 loss to Texas State and a 59–38 loss to FCS opponent Old Dominion. An 80–14 pounding from eventual national champion Florida State preceded a more competitive 24–16 loss to New Mexico State in the season's last game.

The Vandals went 1–10 in 2014, its first year back in the Sun Belt Conference. Their season opener against Florida was canceled after the opening kickoff due to inclement weather, however, Idaho still received the $975,000 in the agreement with Florida to play the game in Gainesville, Florida. Instead, the Vandals' first game of the season took place on September 6, a 38–31 loss to Louisiana-Monroe. On September 13, Petrino's Vandals lost to Western Michigan by a score of 45–33. That was followed by a 36–24 loss to Ohio University on September 20. Losses to South Alabama (34–10), Texas State (35–30) and Georgia Southern (47–24) followed before the Vandals finally picked up their first win of the season with a 29–17 victory over New Mexico State, snapping a thirteen-game losing streak dating back to the previous season. On November 1, Idaho lost to Arkansas State by a margin of 44–28. Next, the Vandals lost to San Diego State by a count of 35–21. Idaho finished the season with a 34–17 defeat at the hands of Troy on November 15 and a 45–28 loss to Appalachian State on November 29. In August 2015, after a team practice a few weeks prior to the start of the 2015 season, Paul Petrino angrily confronted a newspaper reporter who he felt unfairly criticized his team's offense. Facing accusations that he threatened the reporter and had to be physically restrained by an assistant coach, Petrino downplayed the incident and denied he threatened or even "came within seven yards of" the reporter. However, he did admit to "reacting poorly" and "using an unprofessional tone" and apologized in a joint press conference with athletics director Rob Spear.

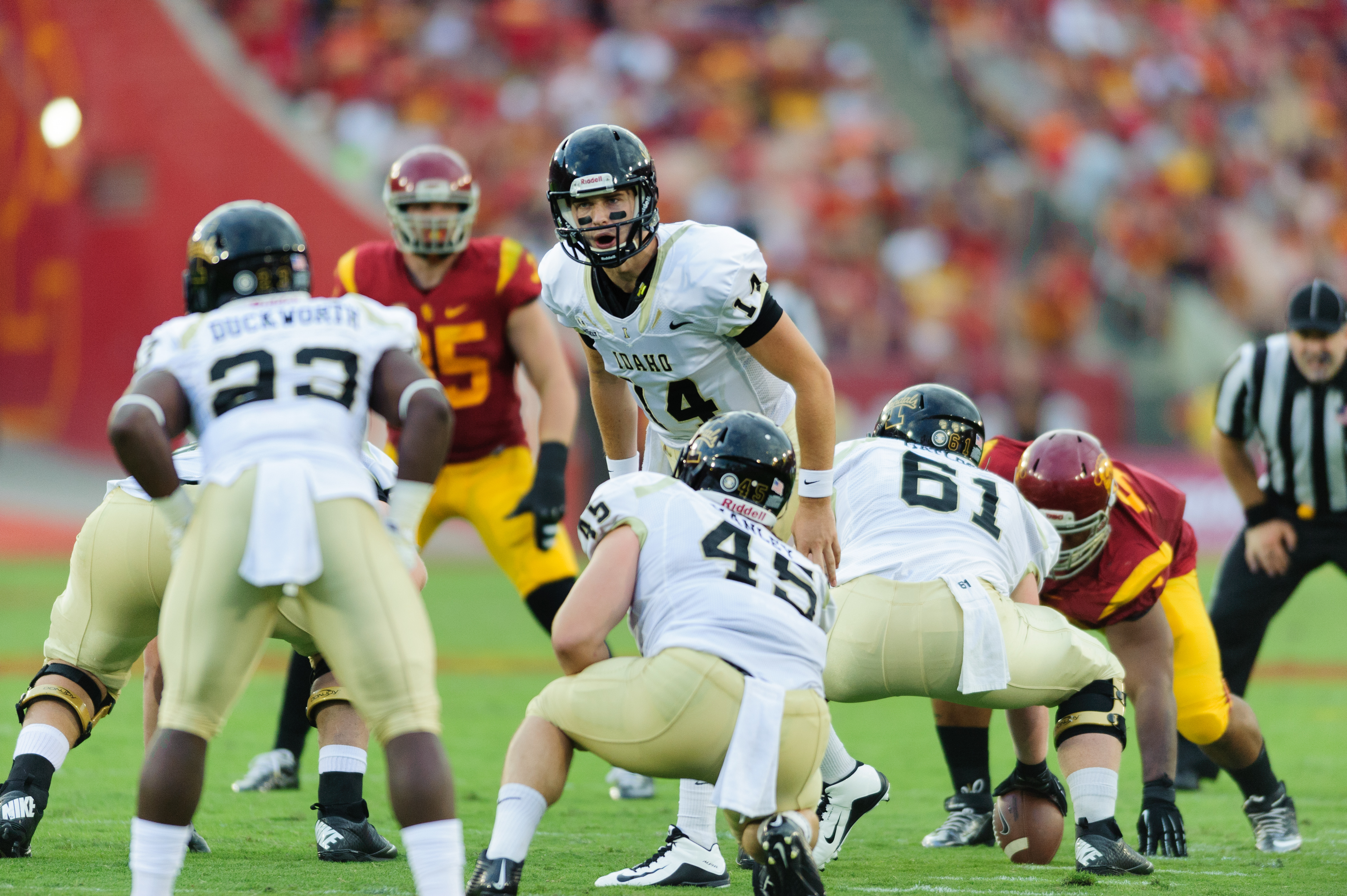
Jake Luton and the Idaho offense line up during a 2015 game against USC

In 2015, the Vandals improved to a 4–8 record. They began the season with a 45–28 loss to Ohio on September 3 and a 59–9 loss to No. 8 USC on September 12. Petrino's squad recorded their first win of the season in the season's third game with a 41–38 win over FCS opponent Wofford. After losing their next two to Georgia Southern and Arkansas State, the Vandals defeated Troy by a score of 19–16 and Louisiana-Monroe by a score of 27–13. Idaho then lost their next four to New Mexico State (55–48 in OT), South Alabama (52–45), Appalachian State (47–20) and Auburn (56–34). The Vandals finished the season on a strong note, defeating Texas State by a score of 38–31 in the regular season finale on November 28. After the 2015 season, Paul Petrino declined an offer to join his brother Bobby's staff at Louisville as offensive coordinator/associate head coach, a position Paul held from 2003 to 2006 during Bobby Petrino's first stint as Louisville's head coach. On April 26, 2016, it was announced that starting in 2018, the Vandals will return to the Big Sky Conference and FCS, becoming the first school to leave the FBS for the FCS. The university made the decision after it was informed by the Sun Belt Conference that it won't be retained as a member beyond the 2017 season. On June 17, 2016, it was announced that University of Idaho administration signed Paul Petrino to a raise and three-year contract extension through the 2020 season.

In 2016, the Vandals improved again to 9–4 and finished in a tie for third place in the Sun Belt. The nine wins were the most in a single season for the Vandals since 1998. Idaho kicked off the season with a 20–17 win over FCS opponent Montana State. They then lost their next two to No. 8 Washington (59–14) and Washington State (56–6). Petrino's team earned their first win of the season with a 33–30 overtime win over UNLV on September 24. The Vandals followed that with a 34–13 loss to Troy. Idaho rebounded to win their next two; beating Louisiana-Monroe by a score of 34–31 and New Mexico State by a score of 55–23. After losing to Appalchian State by a score of 37–19, the Vandals won their next four to close the regular season; topping Louisiana–Lafayette by a score of 23–13, Texas State by a score of 47–14, South Alabama by a score of 38–31 and Georgia State by a score of 37–12. They received an invitation to the 2016 Famous Idaho Potato Bowl where they defeated Colorado State by a score of 61–50, with the teams setting a record for most combined points scored in the bowl game. The Idaho Vandals also set the bowl game's record for most total offensive yardage with 606. After the 2016 season, following Jeff Brohm's departure to Purdue, Paul Petrino was mentioned as a possible candidate for the Western Kentucky head coaching position and even spoke to WKU athletics director Todd Stewart about the position, which was held by his brother Bobby for one season in 2013. However, the position eventually went to Mike Sanford Jr.

Idaho went 4–8 in 2017. They began the season on August 23 with a 28–6 victory over FCS opponent Sacramento State. After a 44–16 loss to UNLV and a 37–28 defeat at the hands of Western Michigan, the Vandals defeated South Alabama by a margin of 29–23 in double overtime. On October 7, Petrino's team lost to Louisiana-Lafayette by a score of 21–16. Another close conference loss followed in the next game in the form of a 23–20 loss to Appalachian State after blowing a 20–0 lead. On October 21, the Vandals were obliterated by Missouri in a 68–21 rout. One week later, Petrino's Idaho team recorded its third win of the season with a 31–23 win over Louisiana-Monroe. After a 24–21 loss to Troy, Idaho lost to Coastal Carolina by a score of 13–7. After a 17–10 loss to New Mexico State, the Vandals concluded the season and its tenure in FBS play on December 2 with a 24–10 victory over Georgia State. On November 18, 2021, the Vandals fired Petrino but allowed him to finish the regular season. Paul Petrino left Moscow as the Vandals' longest-tenured head coach in program history.

=== Jason Eck era (2022–2024) ===
On December 18, 2021, South Dakota State offensive coordinator Jason Eck was named the new Vandals head coach.
