= List of Idaho Vandals in the NFL draft =

This is a list of Idaho Vandals football players in the NFL draft.

== Key ==
| B | Back | K | Kicker | NT | Nose tackle |
| C | Center | LB | Linebacker | FB | Fullback |
| DB | Defensive back | P | Punter | HB | Halfback |
| DE | Defensive end | QB | Quarterback | WR | Wide receiver |
| DT | Defensive tackle | RB | Running back | G | Guard |
| E | End | T | Offensive tackle | TE | Tight end |

== Selections ==
| Year | Round | Pick | Overall | Player | Team | Position |
|---|---|---|---|---|---|---|
| 2019 | 7 | 30 | 244 | Kaden Elliss | New Orleans Saints | LB |
| 2012 | 5 | 19 | 154 | Korey Toomer | Seattle Seahawks | LB |
| 2011 | 5 | 13 | 144 | Shiloh Keo | Houston Texans | DB |
| 2011 | 5 | 29 | 160 | Nathan Enderle | Chicago Bears | QB |
| 2011 | 7 | 35 | 238 | Daniel Hardy | Tampa Bay Buccaneers | TE |
| 2010 | 1 | 17 | 17 | Mike Iupati | San Francisco 49ers | G |
| 2009 | 7 | 12 | 221 | Eddie Williams | Washington Redskins | TE |
| 2008 | 7 | 45 | 252 | David Vobora | St. Louis Rams | LB |
| 2004 | 5 | 9 | 141 | Jake Scott | Indianapolis Colts | T |
| 2001 | 7 | 20 | 220 | Rick DeMulling | Indianapolis Colts | T |
| 2001 | 7 | 27 | 227 | Mike Roberg | Carolina Panthers | TE |
| 2000 | 5 | 7 | 136 | Mao Tosi | Arizona Cardinals | DT |
| 1997 | 3 | 8 | 68 | Ryan Phillips | New York Giants | DE |
| 1996 | 6 | 23 | 190 | Jim Mills | San Diego Chargers | T |
| 1994 | 4 | 13 | 116 | Doug Nussmeier | New Orleans Saints | QB |
| 1993 | 4 | 14 | 98 | Jeff Robinson | Denver Broncos | DE |
| 1990 | 6 | 1 | 138 | John Friesz | San Diego Chargers | QB |
| 1989 | 6 | 12 | 151 | Marvin Washington | New York Jets | DE |
| 1989 | 10 | 12 | 263 | Mark Schlereth | Washington Redskins | G |
| 1986 | 12 | 18 | 323 | Eric Yarber | Washington Redskins | WR |
| 1984u | 1 | 10 | 10 | Ken Hobart | New York Jets | QB |
| 1984 | 10 | 14 | 266 | Kurt Vestman | Chicago Bears | TE |
| 1983 | 7 | 9 | 177 | Sam Merriman | Seattle Seahawks | LB |
| 1982 | 7 | 24 | 191 | Tom Coombs | New York Jets | TE |
| 1982 | 11 | 26 | 305 | Russell Davis | Cincinnati Bengals | RB |
| 1980 | 6 | 15 | 153 | Mark McNeal | Seattle Seahawks | DE |
| 1977 | 4 | 3 | 87 | John Yarno | Seattle Seahawks | C |
| 1976 | 13 | 20 | 367 | Craig Crnick | Oakland Raiders | DE |
| 1974 | 10 | 6 | 240 | Bob Van Duyne | Baltimore Colts | G |
| 1974 | 13 | 5 | 317 | Randy Hall | Baltimore Colts | DB |
| 1973 | 16 | 10 | 400 | Ken Muhlbeier | Denver Broncos | C |
| 1972 | 6 | 16 | 146 | Fred Riley | Atlanta Falcons | WR |
| 1972 | 10 | 7 | 241 | Andy Kupp | New Orleans Saints | G |
| 1972 | 17 | 12 | 428 | Ron Linehan | Pittsburgh Steelers | LB |
| 1970 | 4 | 11 | 89 | Jerry Hendren | Denver Broncos | WR |
| 1970 | 15 | 19 | 383 | Bob Haney | Detroit Lions | T |
| 1970 | 17 | 8 | 424 | Mike Sizelove | Philadelphia Eagles | TE |
| 1967 | 1 | 13 | 13 | Ray McDonald | Washington Redskins | RB |
| 1967 | 5 | 19 | 126 | Ron Porter | Baltimore Colts | LB |
| 1967 | 8 | 7 | 192 | John Foruria | Pittsburgh Steelers | QB |
| 1967 | 9 | 1 | 212 | Tim Lavens | New Orleans Saints | TE |
| 1966 | 5 | 13 | 77 | Dick Arndt | Los Angeles Rams | T |
| 1966 | 7 | 13 | 108 | Ray Miller | Green Bay Packers | DE |
| 1966 | 14 | 10 | 210 | LaVerle Pratt | St. Louis Cardinals | LB |
| 1966 | 15 | 3 | 218 | Joe Dobson | Pittsburgh Steelers | T |
| 1965 | 14 | 9 | 191 | Max Leetzow | Minnesota Vikings | E |
| 1964 | 10 | 11 | 137 | Jim Moran | New York Giants | T |
| 1964 | 11 | 1 | 141 | Dennis Almquist | San Francisco 49ers | G |
| 1964 | 15 | 7 | 203 | Mike Mayne | Los Angeles Rams | E |
| 1961 | 8 | 4 | 102 | Reggie Carolan | Los Angeles Rams | E |
| 1960 | 7 | 3 | 75 | Jim Norton | Detroit Lions | WR |
| 1960 | 11 | 8 | 128 | Stan Fanning | Chicago Bears | T |
| 1959 | 6 | 10 | 70 | Jim Prestel | Cleveland Browns | T |
| 1958 | 4 | 2 | 39 | Jerry Kramer | Green Bay Packers | G |
| 1958 | 4 | 8 | 45 | Wayne Walker | Detroit Lions | LB |
| 1958 | 11 | 6 | 127 | Larry Aldrich | Pittsburgh Steelers | E |
| 1958 | 16 | 2 | 183 | Wade Patterson | Chicago Cardinals | E |
| 1958 | 18 | 11 | 216 | Pete Johnson | Cleveland Browns | T |
| 1957 | 11 | 8 | 129 | Dick Foster | Washington Redskins | T |
| 1955 | 15 | 9 | 178 | Burdette Hess | San Francisco 49ers | G |
| 1954 | 18 | 12 | 217 | Norm Hayes | Detroit Lions | T |
| 1954 | 29 | 12 | 349 | Mel Bertrand | Detroit Lions | C |
| 1953 | 26 | 2 | 303 | Don Ringe | Chicago Cardinals | T |
| 1952 | 9 | 8 | 105 | Glen Christian | San Francisco 49ers | B |
| 1951 | 16 | 8 | 191 | Bill Fray | New York Yanks | T |
| 1951 | 21 | 7 | 250 | King Block | Detroit Lions | B |
| 1951 | 28 | 8 | 335 | Jim Chadband | New York Yanks | B |
| 1950 | 5 | 8 | 61 | Carl Kiilsgaard | Chicago Cardinals | T |
| 1950 | 28 | 8 | 360 | Jerry Diehl | Pittsburgh Steelers | B |
| 1948 | 27 | 3 | 248 | Ed Watkins | Washington Redskins | T |
| 1945 | 29 | 11 | 307 | Jim Evans | Green Bay Packers | E |
| 1943 | 20 | 6 | 186 | Veto Berllus | New York Giants | E |
| 1943 | 26 | 1 | 241 | Irv Konopka | Detroit Lions | T |
| 1943 | 30 | 4 | 284 | Pete Hecomovich | Chicago Cardinals | B |
| 1939 | 8 | 7 | 67 | Dick Trzuskowski | Detroit Lions | T |
| 1939 | 12 | 6 | 106 | Hal Roise | Chicago Bears | B |
| 1936 | 4 | 7 | 34 | Theron Ward | Green Bay Packers | B |

== Notes ==
- Ken Hobart was selected in the 1984 NFL Supplemental Draft, but never reported to an NFL team.
