= Yarno =

Yarno is a name for boys. Yarno first name was found in 13 different countries. The name is given in Belgium, in the Netherlands, in Italy, and very rarely in the United States,...

Yarno is also a surname. Notable people with the surname include:

- George Yarno (born 1957), American football player
- John Yarno (born 1954), American football player
