= Iupati =

Iupati is a Polynesian surname. Notable people with the surname include:

- Loimata Iupati, Tokelauan educator and Bible translator
- Mike Iupati (born 1987), American Samoan player of American football
