= Ed Troxel =

American football coach

Biographical details
- Born: November 20, 1925; Caney, Kansas, U.S.
- Died: January 22, 2001 (aged 75); Kennewick, Washington, U.S.
- Education: Western State College (CO)

Coaching career (HC unless noted)

Football
- 1949–1952: Manzanola HS (CO)
- 1953–1954: Caldwell HS (ID)
- 1955–1957: College of Idaho
- 1958–1966: Borah HS (Boise, ID)
- 1967–1973: Idaho (assistant)
- 1974–1977: Idaho
- 1978–1990: Kennewick HS (WA)

Track
- 1956–1958: College of Idaho
- 1959–1966: Borah HS (Boise, ID)
- 1967–1970: Idaho (assistant)
- 1971–1973: Idaho

Head coaching record
- Overall: 31–39–3 (college football)

Accomplishments and honors

Championships
- Football; 1 NWC (1955)

Ed Troxel
- Military career
- Allegiance: United States
- Branch: United States Navy
- Conflicts: World War II

Edward Ross Troxel (November 20, 1925 – January 22, 2001) was a high school and college football coach in Colorado, Idaho, and eastern Washington. His most notable coaching stops were at Borah High School in Boise, the University of Idaho in Moscow, and Kennewick High School.

== Early life ==
Born in Kansas in 1925, Troxel grew up in Colorado Springs, Colorado. His 33-year-old father died after a pipeline welding accident in Oklahoma when Ed was nine, and his high school football coaches had a great influence on him, leading to his career in coaching.

Troxel moved with his mother Ruth and sister Betty to Colorado Springs in 1940 and served in the U.S. Navy as a teenager during World War II.

== Manzanola and Caldwell ==
After graduation from Western State College in Gunnison, Troxel's first coaching job was in 1949 in tiny Manzanola, fifty miles (80 km) east of Pueblo. In four years his football teams went 42–6 (.875) and won two state titles.

Troxel moved to Caldwell, Idaho, in 1953 to coach Caldwell High School, and his Cougar teams had a 13–3–1 (.794) record in his two years there. In 1955, he moved to the College of Idaho, also in Caldwell, where he coached the Coyotes in football (15–14–0 (.517)), boxing, and track. He was at C of I for three years, but the 16-hour days he was spending at campus forced him to find another job in 1958.

== Borah Lions ==
Borah High School, the second public high school in Boise, opened in the fall of 1958 on the southwest side of the city. Troxel was hired as its first football and track coach, where he instituted a weight-training program that was far ahead of its time. Troxel was at Borah for nine years, and his Lions amassed a dominating 76–8–2 (.895) record in football, winning the Southern Idaho Conference (and unofficial state title) in their first six seasons and a total of eight times, settling for runner-up once (1964). His Borah track teams won four consecutive state titles (1960–63). One of his most notable football players was Steve Preece, of the class of 1965. Preece was the option quarterback of the Oregon State teams of 1967 and 1968, "The Giant Killers," and later played defensive back in the NFL for nine seasons.

Following his departure in 1967, a section of the roadway on the Borah campus was named "Troxel Way." Assistant coach DeLane "De" Pankratz (1930–2020) succeeded Troxel as head coach and Borah continued its dominance in football into the early 1980s.

== Idaho Vandals ==
Troxel moved north to the University of Idaho in Moscow in early 1967, as an assistant coach in both football and track. In football, he served under three head coaches in seven seasons: Steve Musseau, Y C McNease, and Don Robbins. He was named the head coach for the Vandal track team in May 1970, but stepped down when he became the head coach of the football team in December 1973. Troxel had turned down the head football job in May 1970 and again in December 1973, but later accepted after persuasion from his players and concessions from the new athletic director, namely a fourth assistant coach. His annual salary for the first season in 1974 was $16,500, which was $1,500 less than his predecessor Robbins. That season was the last played outdoors in Moscow, as the new Idaho Stadium was enclosed and became the Kibbie Dome in 1975.

One of Troxel's notable hires was his first offensive coordinator, a 27-year-old Dennis Erickson, hired away from alma mater Montana State, who stayed for two seasons. Erickson's successor was Jack Elway, recently at neighboring Washington State, but he left in March after just five weeks on staff to become a Division II head coach in southern California at Cal State Northridge. Despite this turnover at OC before Troxel's third season in 1976, the Vandals went 7–4 (5–1 in the Big Sky), with center John Yarno selected as a Division I first-team AP All-American. At the time, it was the Vandals' second-best football record in history, surpassed only by the 1971 team at 8–3.

With key players lost to graduation and beset by injuries, Idaho fell to 3–8 in 1977. and five weeks later, on December 30, Troxel was requested to resign by new UI president Richard Gibb. The involuntary resignation ended Troxel's four years as head coach and eleven years at the university.

== Kennewick Lions ==
In 1978, Troxel moved west to the Tri-Cities in eastern Washington to coach football at Kennewick High School, a struggling football program that had just one victory in the previous two seasons. The turnaround was immediate: Kennewick lost its first game under Troxel, but then won six straight and made the AAA state playoffs. The Lions beat Gonzaga Prep 17–7 in the first round but fell by four to Lewis & Clark in the quarterfinals.

In thirteen seasons, he led his new Lions to a 104–33 (.759) record, with four conference titles. Kennewick made the state playoffs ten times and posted an 11–10 record in the post-season, advancing to the finals in 1983 (Kingbowl) and the semi-finals in 1984 and 1989. Troxel retired after the 1990 season at the age of 65, ending a coaching career that spanned more than forty years.

In April 1989, Troxel was invited back to the Idaho campus by new head coach John L. Smith to lead one of the sides in the annual Silver & Gold spring game in the Kibbie Dome, opposite 1960s head coach Dee Andros.

== Halls of Fame ==
Troxel was inducted into the high school halls of fame in both Idaho (1998) and Washington (1994), and was a member of the inaugural induction class of the Tri-Cities Sports Hall of Fame in 1999.

== Death, memorial, and family ==
After a three-month battle with pancreatic and liver cancer, Troxel died at the age of 75 in Kennewick on January 22, 2001. He was survived by his wife Donna (married in 1948), daughter Melissa, and three sons: Lon, Van, and Andy. At the time, two of his sons were high school head coaches: Van at Lake City High School in Coeur d'Alene, and Andy at Southridge High School in Kennewick.

His memorial service at Kennewick High was attended by over a thousand, including many athletes and coaches from his various coaching stops. Among those was Oregon State's Dennis Erickson, Troxel's first offensive coordinator at Idaho in 1974. Also in attendance were twenty former players from his championship Borah teams of the 1960s, numerous ex-athletes from his UI football and track teams, and countless members of his Kennewick football teams. He was buried at Desert Lawn Memorial Park in Kennewick.

== Head coaching record ==
=== College football ===
Year	Team	Overall	Conference	Standing	Bowl/playoffs
College of Idaho Coyotes (Northwest Conference) (1955–1957)
1955	College of Idaho	6–4	4–1	T–1st	
1956	College of Idaho	4–5	2–3	5th	
1957	College of Idaho	5–5	3–2	3rd	
College of Idaho:		15–14	9–6		
Idaho Vandals (Big Sky Conference) (1974–1977)
1974	Idaho	2–8–1	2–2–1	3rd	
1975	Idaho	4–5–2	2–2–2	5th	
1976	Idaho	7–4	5–1	2nd	
1977	Idaho	3–8	2–3	T–4th	
Idaho:		16–25–3	11–8–3		
Total:		31–39–3			
National championship Conference title Conference division title or championship game berth
