= Idaho Vandals football =

Football team representing the University of Idaho

2026 Idaho Vandals football team
- First season: 1893; 133 years ago
- Athletic director: Terry Gawlik
- Head coach: Thomas Ford; 2nd season, 4–8 (.333)
- Location: Moscow, Idaho
- Stadium: Kibbie Dome (capacity: 15,250)
- NCAA division: Division I FCS
- Conference: Big Sky
- Colors: Silver and Vandal gold
- All-time record: 504–656–26 (.436)
- Bowl record: 3–0 (1.000)

Conference championships
- PCC: 1927 Big Sky: 1965, 1968, 1971, 1982, 1985, 1987, 1988, 1989, 1992 Big West: 1998
- Consensus All-Americans: 1
- Rivalries: Idaho State (rivalry); Montana (rivalry); Eastern Washington; Boise State (rivalry); Washington State (rivalry)

Uniforms
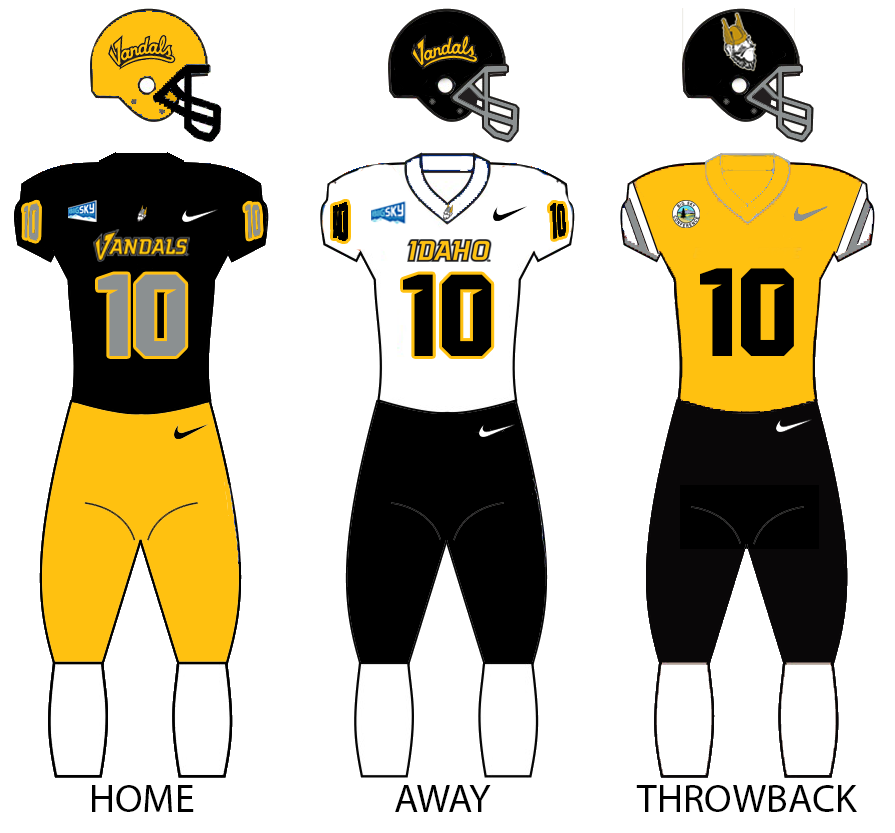
- Fight song: Go, Vandals, Go
- Mascot: Joe Vandal
- Marching band: The Sound of Idaho
- Outfitter: Nike
- Website: GoVandals.com

The Idaho Vandals are the college football team that represents the University of Idaho and plays its home games at the Kibbie Dome, an indoor facility on the university's Moscow, Idaho campus. Idaho is a member of the Big Sky Conference in the Football Championship Subdivision (FCS). The Vandals are coached by Thomas Ford.

The Idaho football program began 133 years ago in 1893, and entering the 2026 season the Vandals have an all-time record of 510–656–28. They have played in three bowl games in their history, all victories in the Humanitarian/Famous Idaho Potato Bowl in Boise in 1998, 2009, and 2016. As a Division I-AA (FCS) program for 18 seasons (1978–1995), Idaho made the playoffs eleven times and advanced to the national semifinals twice (1988, 1993).

On April 28, 2016, university president Chuck Staben announced the football program would return to the Big Sky and FCS in 2018. This followed the Sun Belt Conference's announcement on March 1 that the associate membership of Idaho and New Mexico State for football would end after the 2017 season. Idaho is the first FBS program to voluntarily drop to FCS.

== History ==
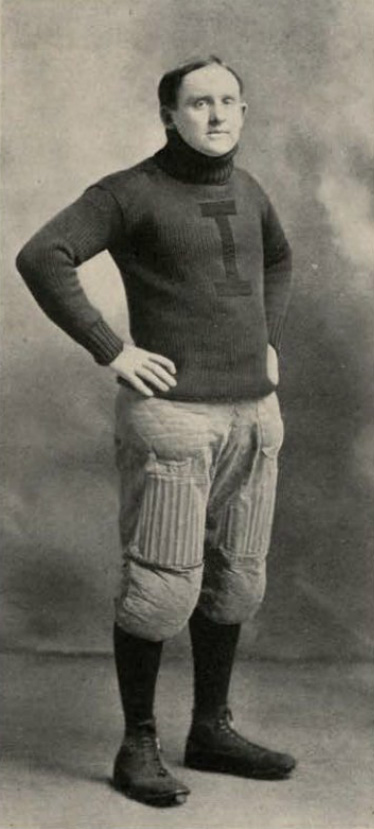
John Griffith, head coach from 1902 to 1906 and 1910 to 1914.

The University of Idaho fielded its first football team in 1893. The team had no nickname until 1917, when the University of Idaho basketball team under alumnus Hec Edmundson played defense with such ferocity that they were said to have "vandalized" their opponents; the name "Vandals" was then adopted for all of the school's sports teams.

Idaho competed as an independent until joining the Northwest Conference in 1908, and entered the Pacific Coast Conference in 1922. John G. Griffith, who coached the Vandals from 1902 to 1906 and again from 1910 to 1914, remains the program's longest-tenured head coach. Idaho completed the program's first forward pass against Washington State in 1907, a fourth-quarter touchdown thrown from a drop-kick formation that helped produce a 5–4 victory. In 1927, under Charles F. Erb, the Vandals were co-champions of the Pacific Coast Conference, their only title in a major conference.

Idaho joined the Big Sky Conference in 1965 and shared the conference championship in its first season, the first of nine Big Sky titles. Football moved to NCAA Division I-AA in 1978, and Idaho made eleven playoff appearances through 1995, reaching the national semifinals in 1988 and 1993 and the quarterfinals in 1982 and 1990.

Under John L. Smith (1989–1994), the Vandals won two Big Sky championships and made five playoff appearances, advancing to the 1993 semifinals; the 1989 team went 8–0 in conference play, the only undefeated conference season in program history. Smith's 53 wins remain the most in program history. Quarterbacks John Friesz and Doug Nussmeier won the Walter Payton Award, given to the most outstanding offensive player in I-AA, in 1989 and 1993, respectively.

Idaho returned to Division I-A in 1996 as a member of the Big West Conference, winning the conference championship and the Humanitarian Bowl in 1998. The Vandals then competed in the Sun Belt Conference from 2001 to 2004, the Western Athletic Conference from 2005 to 2012, as an independent in 2013, and as a Sun Belt football-only member from 2014 to 2017 while their other sports competed in the Big Sky. Idaho went 3–0 in bowl games during that stretch, adding Humanitarian Bowl and Famous Idaho Potato Bowl victories in 2009 and 2016.

In 2018, Idaho became the first program to move from the Football Bowl Subdivision to the Football Championship Subdivision, rejoining the Big Sky. The Vandals returned to the playoffs in each of Jason Eck's three seasons from 2022 to 2024, reaching the quarterfinals in 2023 and 2024 before Eck left for New Mexico. Thomas Ford was named the program's 37th head coach in December 2024.

== Conference affiliations ==
=== Timeline ===
- Independent (1894–1907)
- Northwest Conference (1908–1925)
- Pacific Coast Conference (1922–1958)
- Independent (1959–1964)
- Big Sky Conference (1965–1995) (Note: Starting in 1968, the Big Sky competed at the highest level (university division) in all sports except football (college division). The sole exception was the Vandals, in the university division for football through 1977 (except 1967 and 1968). Football moved to the new Division I-AA in 1978, including Idaho. So, the Vandals football team competed in: University Division from 1965 to 1966; College Division from 1967 to 1968; University Division from 1969 to 1972; Division I from 1973 to 1977; Division I-AA (now FCS) from 1978 to 1995.)
- Big West Conference (1996–2000)
- Sun Belt Conference (2001–2004)
- Western Athletic Conference (2005–2012)
- FBS Independent (2013)
- Sun Belt Conference (2014–2017)
- Big Sky Conference (2018–present)

=== Conference history ===
The Idaho football program began competing 133 years ago in 1893, and was a member of the Pacific Coast Conference from 1922 to 1958. It was then an independent until 1965, when it began league play in the Big Sky Conference. At the time, the other four football programs in the conference were members of the College Division (today's Division II), while Idaho remained a member of the University Division (today's Division I) through 1977, except for an involuntary demotion for 1967 and 1968. It maintained its status by playing a majority of games against University Division opponents.

A charter member of the Big Sky in 1963, Idaho did not participate in league play for football until 1965, the Big Sky's third year, after the conference demanded it. With its upper division status, the Vandals were ineligible for the College Division (D-II) playoffs. Notably, in 1971, the Vandals won their first outright conference title in school history. However, runner-up Boise State received the Big Sky's automatic berth. Because of its hybrid status, Idaho requested to retain its higher allotment of football scholarships (75) than the other conference members (62), which was expectedly disallowed. The university received an invitation in 1973 to join the Pacific Coast Athletic Association (later the Big West Conference), but the state board of education (concurrent board of regents) rejected it by a vote of 4 to 3. The Big Sky moved up to the new Division I-AA in 1978 (while Idaho moved down).

Idaho experienced its best years in football from 1985 to 1995, when it made the I-AA national playoffs in ten of 11 seasons with four different head coaches, reaching the semifinals twice. After 18 years in Division I-AA, Idaho returned to Division I-A competition (now called the FBS) in 1996 in the Big West.

Idaho rejoined the Sun Belt Conference in 2014 after a season as an independent in 2013, and eight seasons in the Western Athletic Conference (WAC), which dropped football after the 2012 season. The Vandals were previously in the Sun Belt (also football only) from 2001 through 2004, after the Big West dropped football.

On August 18, 2012, Idaho was cleared to stay in the Football Bowl Subdivision as an independent after the WAC announced it would drop football effective with the end of the 2012 season. Idaho would only remain a football independent for the 2013 season; on March 27 of that year, the Sun Belt Conference announced that Idaho would return as a football-only member starting with the 2014 season. Nearly two years later in 2016, the Sun Belt Conference announced via teleconference that neither the University of Idaho nor New Mexico State University would be renewed after the 2017 football season. In 2018, Idaho resumed full membership in the Big Sky Conference, which participates in the Football Championship Subdivision.

== Conference championships ==
The Vandals have won 11 conference championships in their history, nine in the Big Sky.

Season	Conference	Head coach	Overall record	Conference record
1927^{†}	Pacific Coast	Charles Erb	4–1–3	2–0–2
1965^{†}	Big Sky	Steve Musseau	5–4	3–1
1968^{†}	Big Sky	Y C McNease	5–5	3–1
1971	Big Sky	Don Robbins	8–3	4–1
1982^{†}	Big Sky	Dennis Erickson	9–4	5–2
1985	Big Sky	Dennis Erickson	9–3	6–1
1987	Big Sky	Keith Gilbertson	9–3	7–1
1988	Big Sky	Keith Gilbertson	11–2	7–1
1989	Big Sky	John L. Smith	9–3	8–0
1992^{†}	Big Sky	John L. Smith	9–3	6–1
1998	Big West	Chris Tormey	9–3	4–1

^{†} Co-champions

== NCAA Division I-AA/FCS playoffs ==
For 18 seasons, from 1978 to 1995, Idaho was a member of NCAA Division I-AA, and in 2018 returned to compete in what is now called the NCAA Division I Football Championship Subdivision (FCS). The Vandals have participated in the NCAA Division I Football Championship playoffs 14 times, with an all-time playoff record of 8–14 (.364), being 6–5 at home and 2–9 on the road. They have a 4–8 record in the first round (2–4 at home, 2–4 away).

The program's best advancements were to the national semifinals in 1988 and 1993, but both seasons ended with road losses by large margins to the eventual national champions. The 1982 and 1990 teams advanced to the quarterfinals, but both lost close road games to the eventual national champions.

Year	Coach	Bowl	Opponent	Result
1982	Dennis Erickson	First Round; Quarterfinal	Montana @ Eastern Kentucky	W 21–7; L 30–38
1985	Dennis Erickson	First Round	Eastern Washington	L 38–42
1986\	Keith Gilbertson	First Round	@ Nevada-Reno	L 7–27
1987	Keith Gilbertson	First Round	Weber State	L 30–59
1988	Keith Gilbertson	First Round; Quarterfinal; Semifinal	Montana; Northwestern State @ Furman	W 38–19; W 38–30; L 7–38
1989	John L. Smith	First Round	Eastern Illinois	L 21–38
1990	John L. Smith	First Round; Quarterfinal	@ SW Missouri State @ Georgia Southern	W 41–35; L 27–28
1992	John L. Smith	First Round	McNeese State	L 20–23
1993	John L. Smith	First Round; Quarterfinal; Semifinal	@ NE Louisiana; Boston U. @ Youngstown State	W 34–31; W 21–14; L 16–35
1994	John L. Smith	First Round	@ McNeese State	L 21–38
1995	Chris Tormey	First Round	@ McNeese State	L 3–33
2022	Jason Eck	First Round	@ Southeastern Louisiana	L 42–45
2023	Jason Eck	Second Round; Quarterfinal	Southern Illinois; Albany	W 20–17; L 22–30
2024	Jason Eck	Second Round; Quarterfinal	Lehigh @ Montana State	W 34–13; L 19–52

- I-AA/FCS playoff field: 4 teams (1978–80), 8 teams (1981), 12 teams (1982–85), 16 teams (1986–2009), 24 teams (2013–present)

== Bowl games ==
In their time in the NCAA Division I Football Bowl Subdivision (FBS), Idaho participated in three bowl games, all in Boise. The Vandals had a 3–0 record.

Year	Coach	Bowl	Opponent	Result
1998	Chris Tormey	Humanitarian Bowl	Southern Miss	W 42–35
2009	Robb Akey	Humanitarian Bowl	Bowling Green	W 43–42
2016	Paul Petrino	Famous Idaho Potato Bowl	Colorado State	W 61–50

== Head coaches ==
Thomas Ford, hired in December 2024, is the 37th head coach in program history. Coaching records through the 2025 season are listed below.

Coach	Tenure	Seasons	Wins	Losses	Ties	Pct.	Conf. championships	Playoffs/bowls
Fred Herbold	1900–1901	2	4	2	1	.643		
John G. Griffith (a)	1902–1906	5	13	9	1	.587		
John R. Middleton	1907–1908	1	3	4	0	.429		
John S. Grogan	1909	1	2	3	0	.400		
John G. Griffith (b)	1910–1914	5	15	13	1	.534		
Charles M. Rademacher	1915	1	1	4	1	.250		
Wilfred C. Bleamaster	1916–1917	2	5	8	0	.385		
Ralph Hutchinson	1919	1	2	3	0	.400		
Thomas Kelley	1920–1921	2	8	5	1	.607		
Robert L. Mathews	1922–1925	4	16	14	2	.531		
Charles F. Erb	1926–1928	3	10	9	5	.521	1 (1927)	
Leo Calland	1929–1934	6	21	30	0	.412		
Ted Bank	1935–1940	6	18	33	3	.361		
Francis Schmidt	1941–1942	2	7	12	0	.368		
Babe Brown	1945–1946	2	2	15	0	.118		
Dixie Howell	1947–1950	4	13	20	1	.397		
Raymond A. Curfman	1951–1953	3	7	19	1	.278		
Skip Stahley	1954–1961	8	22	51	1	.304		
Dee Andros	1962–1964	3	11	16	1	.411		
Steve Musseau	1965–1967	3	13	17	0	.433	1 (1965)	
Y C McNease	1968–1969	2	7	13	0	.350	1 (1968)	
Don Robbins	1970–1973	4	20	24	0	.455	1 (1971)	
Ed Troxel	1974–1977	4	16	25	3	.398		
Jerry Davitch	1978–1981	4	15	29	0	.341		
Dennis Erickson (a)	1982–1985	4	32	15	0	.681	2 (1982, 1985)	2 (1982, 1985)
Keith Gilbertson	1986–1988	3	28	9	0	.757	2 (1987, 1988)	3 (1986–1988)
John L. Smith	1989–1994	6	53	21	0	.716	2 (1989, 1992)	5 (1989, 1990, 1992–1994)
Chris Tormey	1995–1999	5	33	23	0	.589	1 (1998)	2 (1995, 1998)
Tom Cable	2000–2003	4	11	35	0	.239		
Nick Holt	2004–2005	2	5	18	0	.217		
Dennis Erickson (b)	2006	1	4	8	0	.333		
Robb Akey	2007–2012	6	20	50	0	.286		1 (2009)
Jason Gesser ^	2012	1^	0	4	0	.000		
Paul Petrino	2013–2021	9	34	66	0	.340		1 (2016)
Jason Eck	2022–2024	3	26	13	0	.667		3 (2022–2024)
Thomas Ford	2025–present	1	4	8	0	.333		

^ Interim head coach – Gesser coached the final four games of 2012 after Akey was relieved on October 21.

== Home venues ==
Idaho played its home games at MacLean Field on campus from 1914 until Neale Stadium opened in 1937. Neale was an earthen horseshoe with wooden grandstands along the sidelines; its first game was a 7–6 upset of Oregon State on September 25, 1937. The stadium was declared unsafe in August 1969, its south grandstand burned that November, and it was demolished in 1970 and 1971 to make room for a replacement.

The university built the Kibbie Dome on the same site, opening it in October 1971 as an outdoor concrete stadium before a barrel-arched roof and vertical end walls were added following the 1974 season; the enclosed facility reopened in September 1975. With 16,000 permanent seats, it was the second-smallest home stadium in the Football Bowl Subdivision from 1997 to 2017, the Vandals' final two decades at that level. The venue has hosted Idaho football, tennis, indoor track and field, and soccer, and was also the program's basketball home until the opening of ICCU Arena in 2021.

== Rivalries ==
=== Boise State ===
The University of Idaho formerly enjoyed an in-state rivalry with Boise State University. The Boise State–Idaho rivalry began with a Bronco victory in the first meeting in 1971. They met every year through 2010, and with the exception of four years, (2001–2004), the matchup was a conference game. The rivalry was dominated by streaks as Idaho won 12 straight years from 1982 to 1993, while Boise State won the most recent 12 games between 1999 and 2010, mostly by large margins. BSU leads the rivalry with a series record of 22–17–1 (.563). Since Boise State's move to the Mountain West Conference in 2011, Boise State has refused to play Idaho home-and-home in football. In response, Idaho has refused to play Boise State at ExtraMile Arena for men's basketball. Boise State will host Idaho on September 6, 2031 in football. Boise State and Idaho have also recently met in exhibition games in men's basketball.

=== Idaho State ===
The University of Idaho enjoys another in-state rivalry with Idaho State University. The rivalry was at its most competitive in the 1970s and 1980s, with neither team three-peating. Idaho has won eleven of the last fifteen and leads the overall series at 33–14 (.702). Idaho's move into the Football Bowl Subdivision put the rivalry on hold for several years, the two schools only playing each other four times during Idaho's stay in the FBS. The series was revived in 2018 when Idaho dropped back to FCS and rejoined the Big Sky Conference in football (its other sports rejoined in 2014). Idaho leads 5–3 against Idaho State since rejoining the FCS.

With Idaho's rejoining of the Big Sky Conference in 2018, Idaho Central Credit Union sponsored a rivalry series titled "Battle of the Domes", which was applied to multiple sports. Idaho State was the first of the pair to play its home games indoors, opening the ICCU Dome (originally ASISU Minidome, later Holt Arena) in 1970. The Kibbie Dome in Moscow was enclosed in 1975, after four years as an outdoor venue; the last two outdoor games in this series were played there in 1971 and 1973, then known as new Idaho Stadium.

Ahead of the 2023 season, the Battle of the Domes branding was retired after Idaho Central Credit Union adjusted its sponsorship with both institutions. A temporary trophy was created by Idaho head coach Jason Eck, who fashioned a Mr. Potato Head to the base of the original Battle of the Domes trophy. In 2024, the rivalry's new trophy was officially introduced, a large potato carved out of douglas fir alongside a metal cutout of Idaho, dubbed the Potato State Trophy. Idaho won first possession of the trophy after defeating Idaho State 40–17 in the 2024 season. The following year, Idaho State defeated Idaho at the Kibbie Dome by a score of 37–16, ending a four-game losing streak and earning their first possession of the trophy.

=== Montana ===
The University of Idaho also enjoys a rivalry with the University of Montana. Known as the Little Brown Stein game, Idaho and Montana first played 123 years ago in 1903 and have played 84 times, and the stein was introduced 88 years ago in 1938, at the 25th meeting. Idaho leads the overall series 56–32–2 (.633), which also includes two Division I-AA playoff wins at home in the 1980s. Montana has had the upper hand since 1991, winning thirteen of the last sixteen. During Idaho's stay in the Football Bowl Subdivision from 1996 to 2017, the teams met five times, with Montana winning four. The schools are about 200 miles (320 km) apart; Moscow and Missoula are on opposite sides of the lower Idaho Panhandle, separated by the Bitterroot Mountains over Lolo Pass.

Both were members of the old Pacific Coast Conference (the forerunner of today's Pac-12); Montana departed after the 1949 season, and the PCC disbanded in the summer of 1959. The universities were charter members of the Big Sky Conference in 1963, (although Idaho remained an independent in football until 1965) and their final season as conference opponents was in 1995. While Montana has been in the Big Sky since its inception, Idaho has changed its conference affiliation no fewer than five times since 1995: Idaho moved to the Big West for all sports in 1996, returning to Division I-A after 18 years in I-AA. After the 2000 season, the Big West dropped football. Idaho became a football-only member of the Sun Belt Conference in 2001 while remaining a full Big West member. Idaho joined the WAC for all sports in 2005 as part of a major NCAA conference realignment. After the WAC experienced a near-complete membership turnover in the early 2010s, it dropped football after the 2012 season. Idaho football was an FBS independent for one season in 2013, then returned to the Big Sky in 2014 except for football, which rejoined the Sun Belt. Idaho dropped back to the FCS in 2018 and resumed football membership in the Big Sky. Since rejoining the conference, Montana leads Idaho 5–1.

=== Washington State ===
Known as the Battle of the Palouse, the first football game between the University of Idaho and Washington State University was played in November 1894 and resulted in a win for Washington State. The game in 1898 was not played because Idaho had an ineligible ringer from Lapwai, F.J. McFarland, a recent All-American from Carlisle. The Vandals' first-ever forward pass was attempted against the Cougars in 1907: it was completed for a touchdown from a drop-kick formation in the fourth quarter and led to a 5–4 victory.

Washington State has dominated the local rivalry, holding a 73–16–3 lead. The record since 1926 is even more dominant, with a 58–5–2 advantage for the Cougars. The longest winning streak for Idaho was three games (1923–1925), and has only five victories since that three-peat (1954, 1964, 1965, 1999, & 2000) and two ties (1927, 1950) to offset the 56 losses. The games were skipped in 1969 and 1971, which was unfortunate for Idaho as the 1971 Vandals posted one of the best records (8–3) in school history, while WSU was 4–7. The rivalry became increasingly one-sided as WSU dominated in the 1970s (except for 1974) and the original series ended, following the 1978 game. From 1979 to 1997, the game was played just twice (1982, and 1989) until the ten-year renewal from 1998 to 2007. Since their last wins in 1999 and 2000, Idaho has been physically outmatched in most of the ten games; the game has been played only three times since 2007: in 2013, 2016, and 2022, the most recent was a competitive seven-point margin.

As two universities are in close proximity, from 1938 to 1968 there was a tradition called The Loser's Walk, where during the week following the game students of the losing school walked from their own campus to the winners', then receive rides back home from the winning side. This has frequently been misreported as students walking back to their own campus immediately following the game. In 1954, the walk made national news when about 2,000 students from Washington State College made the trek east from Pullman to Moscow after the Cougars lost to Idaho for the first time in 29 years.

In a span of less than five months, from November 1969 to April 1970, both schools' aged wooden stadiums (Idaho's Neale Stadium and WSU's Rogers Field) burned down due to suspected arson. The WSU–Idaho game in 1970 was dubbed the Displaced Bowl, which was held in Joe Albi Stadium in Spokane on September 19. The Cougars won the game (their only win that season), as well as the next ten against the Vandals. The 1970 game was the first in the rivalry played on AstroTurf, which was new to Joe Albi that season. In 1978, the NCAA split Division I football in two: I-A (now FBS) and I-AA (now FCS). Washington State was in Division I-A as part of the Pac-10 Conference and Idaho downgraded to I-AA as part of the Big Sky Conference, whose other football members moved up from Division II. In the late 1970s, I-A football programs were allowed 50% more scholarships and twice as many assistant coaches as I-AA teams. During the years they were in different divisions, the schools met only twice, 1982 in Spokane and 1989 in Pullman. In 1996, Idaho moved back up to Division I-A in the Big West Conference, and Idaho and WSU rekindled their century-old rivalry. Since the rivalry was reinstated in 1998, every game has been played at Martin Stadium in Pullman, except for the matchup in 2003, which was played at Seattle's Seahawks Stadium. The last game played on the Idaho side of the border was in 1966, a come-from-behind 14–7 Cougar victory on a very muddy field to prevent a Vandal three-peat.

After ten years of the renewed rivalry, Vandals head coach Robb Akey, previously WSU's defensive coordinator, said in 2008 that he preferred the game not be played every year, instead saying he would prefer it as a "once-in-a-while thing." Only one game was played during Akey's tenure, in his first season in 2007, and he was fired in October 2012. The meeting in 2013 on September 21 was a one-year revival, and WSU won 56–6 in 2016. The Cougars won 24–17 in 2022, but the Vandals were significantly more competitive under first-year head coach Jason Eck. Another close game was played in 2025, Idaho losing by only three points, 13–10. Future games are scheduled in 2027 and 2029.

== College Football Hall of Fame ==
College Football Hall of Fame
Name	Position	Year	Inducted	Ref
Dennis Erickson	Head coach	1982–1985, 2006	2019	
John Friesz	QB	1986–1989	2006	

Erickson began his head coaching career in 1982 at Idaho, where he became the first Vandal head coach since 1938 to post consecutive winning seasons and the first in program history with four consecutive winning seasons. He led Idaho to the Big Sky Conference title in 1985 and had two trips to the Division I-AA (FCS) Playoffs (1982, 1985).

Friesz averaged 367.4 passing yards a game as a quarterback and he was the first quarterback to win the Walter Payton Award as the outstanding player in I-AA football in 1989, when he threw for 4,041 yards and 31 touchdowns.

== National award winners ==
Idaho players have won the Walter Payton Award twice and the Jerry Rice Award once.

Chris Schenkel Award
Year	Name	Position
2008	Bob Curtis	Broadcaster

- Walter Payton Award

Walter Payton Award
Year	Name	Position
1989	John Friesz	Quarterback
1993	Doug Nussmeier	Quarterback

The Walter Payton Award is awarded annually to the most

outstanding offensive player in the NCAA Division I Football Championship Subdivision (formerly Division I-AA) of college football.

- Jerry Rice Award

Jerry Rice Award
Year	Name	Position
2022	Gevani McCoy	Quarterback

The Jerry Rice Award is awarded annually in the United States to the most outstanding freshman player in the NCAA Division I Football Championship Subdivision (FCS) of college football as chosen by a nationwide panel of media and college sports information directors.

== All Americans ==
Offensive lineman Mike Iupati was a consensus All-American in 2009.

All Americans
Year	Name	Position	Team
1924	Skippy Stivers	QB	WC-3rd
1965	Ray McDonald	RB	AP-2nd, NEA-2nd
1966	Ray McDonald	RB	Time, TSN, AP-2nd, UPI-2nd, NEA-2nd
1976	John Yarno	C	AP
2009	Mike Iupati	G	AP, AFCA, FWAA, WCFF, SI, PFW, ESPN, CBS, Rivals, Scout, TSN-2nd

== Notable players ==
=== NFL ===
- Jesse Davis – guard for the Miami Dolphins (2017–21) and Minnesota Vikings (2022–present)
- John Friesz – quarterback in the College Football Hall of Fame, 1989 Walter Payton Award, NFL (1990–2000)
- Mike Iupati – consensus All-American guard, 17th overall pick in 2010 NFL draft, (2010–20); San Francisco 49ers, Arizona Cardinals, Seattle Seahawks
- Jerry Kramer – five-time All-Pro guard (five NFL & two Super Bowl titles) with the Green Bay Packers (1958–68); author and Pro Football Hall of Famer (2018)
- Benson Mayowa – defensive end for the Arizona Cardinals (2018), Dallas Cowboys (2016–17), Oakland Raiders (2014–15, 2019), Seattle Seahawks (2013, 2020–21), including Super Bowl XLVIII.
- Ray McDonald – 13th overall pick in 1967 draft, running back for the Washington Redskins, 1967–68.
- Jim Norton – safety, all-time AFL interceptions leader, first number retired (#43) by the Houston Oilers (1960–68)
- Jeff Robinson – 1993–2009, Denver Broncos, Rams, Cowboys, Rams, Seahawks. Super Bowl Champion in Super Bowl XXXIV (Rams).
- Mark Schlereth – two-time Pro Bowl guard, three Super Bowl titles with the Washington Redskins and Denver Broncos (1989–2000)
- Jake Scott – guard for the Philadelphia Eagles (2012), Tennessee Titans (2008–11), Indianapolis Colts (2004–07), including Super Bowl XLI.
- Wee Willie Smith – New York Giants (1934 NFL Champions)
- Korey Toomer – linebacker (2012–18): Seattle Seahawks, Oakland Raiders, San Francisco 49ers
- David Vobora – Mr. Irrelevant of the 2008 NFL draft, linebacker with the Seattle Seahawks
- Wayne Walker – All-Pro linebacker with the Detroit Lions (1958–72), started 200 games; sportscaster
- Marvin Washington – defensive end (1989–1999) for Jets, 49ers, Broncos. Super Bowl Champion (XXXIII, Broncos).
- John Yarno – first of two All-Americans from Idaho at FBS level, five-year starter at center for the Seattle Seahawks (1978–82)

=== CFL ===
- Brian Allen – wide receiver, Edmonton Eskimos (1984)
- Jerry Campbell – LB, (1966–75), inducted into Canadian Football Hall of Fame in 1996
- Ken Hobart – quarterback (QB), USFL (1984–85), CFL (1985–90), winner of Jeff Russel Memorial Trophy in 1985
- Craig Juntunen – QB, (1978–79)
- Rolly Lumbala – fullback, BC Lions (2008–2018)
- Aaron Grymes – defensive back, Edmonton Elks (2013–2024)
- David Ungerer – wide receiver, Toronto Argonauts (2023–present)

=== Coaches ===
(former Vandal football players coaching in either college or professional football)

- Steve Belko
- Steve Buratto
- Tom Cable
- Tony Knap
- Mike Kramer
- Scott Linehan
- Don Matthews
- Doug Nussmeier
- Bud Riley
- Lyle Smith
- Chris Tormey

=== Other ===
- Anthony Curcio, author, public speaker, and former career criminal
- Dennis Eichhorn, writer
- Bill Fagerbakke, actor
- Dan Monson, college basketball coach
- Kendrick Trotter, entrepreneur

== Retired numbers ==
Idaho Vandals retired numbers
No.	Player	Pos.	Tenure	No. ret.	Ref.
9	Ken Hobart	QB	1980–1983		
17	John Friesz	QB	1986–1989	2006	
53	Wayne Walker	LB/C/LS	1955–1957		
56	John Yarno	C	1973–1976	1977	
64	Jerry Kramer	G/DT/K	1955–1957	1963	

== Top NFL draft selections ==
Idaho's highest NFL draft selections are listed below; the full list is at List of Idaho Vandals in the NFL draft.

Player	Position	Overall	Round	Draft	Franchise
Ray McDonald	RB	13	1st	1967	Washington Redskins
Mike Iupati	G	17	1st	2010	San Francisco 49ers
Jerry Kramer	G / PK	39	4th	1958	Green Bay Packers
Wayne Walker	LB / C / LS / PK	45	4th	1958	Detroit Lions
Carl Kiilsgaard	T	61	5th	1950	Chicago Cardinals
Ryan Phillips	LB	68	3rd	1997	New York Giants
Jim Prestel	DT	70	6th	1959	Cleveland Browns
Jim Norton	S / P	75	7th	1960	Detroit Lions
John Yarno	C	87	4th	1977	Seattle Seahawks
Jerry Hendren	WR	89	4th	1970	Denver Broncos
Jeff Robinson	DE / TE / LS	98	4th	1993	Denver Broncos
Reggie Carolan	TE	102	8th	1961	Los Angeles Rams
Doug Nussmeier	QB	116	4th	1994	New Orleans Saints
Ron Porter	LB	126	5th	1967	Baltimore Colts
Mao Tosi	DT	136	5th	2000	Arizona Cardinals
John Friesz	QB	138	6th	1990	San Diego Chargers
Jake Scott	G	141	5th	2004	Indianapolis Colts
Marvin Washington	DE	151	6th	1989	New York Jets
Korey Toomer	LB	154	5th	2012	Seattle Seahawks
Sam Merriman	LB	177	7th	1983	Seattle Seahawks
Kaden Elliss	LB	244	7th	2019	New Orleans Saints
David Vobora	LB	252	7th	2008	St. Louis Rams
Mark Schlereth	G	263	10th	1989	Washington Redskins

== Future non-conference opponents ==
Announced schedules as of August 10, 2026.

2027	2028	2029	2030	2031	2032	2033
at Washington State	at Oregon State	at Washington State	South Dakota	at Boise State	at Oregon State	at Washington State
at North Dakota	North Dakota	at South Dakota				
Portland State						
