= Don Robbins =

American football player and coach

Biographical details
- Born: October 27, 1933; Fort Worth, Texas, U.S.
- Died: September 18, 2020 (aged 86); College Station, Texas, U.S.
- Education: Texas A&M University; B.S., M.Ed.

Playing career
- 1953–1955: Texas A&M
- Position: End

Coaching career (HC unless noted)
- 1957: Texas A&M (Freshmen)
- 1958: Port Arthur HS (TX)
- 1959–1960: Snyder HS (TX)
- 1961–1962: Big Spring HS (TX) (assistant)
- 1963–1965: Big Spring HS (TX)
- 1966–1967: Texas Western / UTEP (DL)
- 1968–1969: Idaho (DL)
- 1970–1973: Idaho
- 1976–1990: Big Spring HS (TX)

Head coaching record
- Overall: 20–24 (college)

Accomplishments and honors

Championships
- 1 Big Sky (1971)

Donald Roy Robbins (October 27, 1933 – September 18, 2020) was an American football coach. He was the head coach at the University of Idaho from 1970 through 1973, compiling a record of 20–24.

== Playing career ==
An identical twin born in Fort Worth, Texas, Robbins grew up primarily in Breckenridge, one of three sons of football coach Cooper Robbins, Sr. Along with twin brother Ron, he graduated from Breckenridge High School in 1952, where his father was the head football coach for seven seasons (1945–1951), then became the freshman football coach at Texas A&M in 1952, and son Don played for him that first season.

Following Robbins' sophomore season, Paul "Bear" Bryant was hired as the head coach at A&M and Robbins was a member of the Junction Boys as a junior end in September 1954. He graduated in 1956 and later earned a master's degree in education from A&M.

== Coaching career ==
After coaching in Texas at Big Spring High School, Robbins became a collegiate assistant coach in 1966 at Texas Western (renamed the University of Texas at El Paso (UTEP) in 1967) under head coach Bobby Dobbs. After two seasons in El Paso, he was hired as an assistant at Idaho in April 1968 under first-year head coach Y C McNease.

When McNease was dismissed after spring drills in May 1970, Robbins was promoted to head coach of the Vandals. His 1971 team had the best record in the history of the school at 8–3, but the next two seasons were less successful and he was dismissed in November 1973. He was succeeded by Ed Troxel, an assistant under Robbins and his two predecessors (and the head track coach).

Robbins returned to Big Spring High School as head coach and athletic director in 1976. After retirement, he lived in College Station and died in 2020 at age 86.

== Head coaching record ==
=== College ===
Year	Team	Overall	Conference	Standing	Bowl/playoffs
Idaho Vandals (Big Sky Conference) (1970–1973)
1970	Idaho	4–7	2–2	T–3rd	
1971	Idaho	8–3	4–1	1st	
1972	Idaho	4–7	2–3	5th	
1973	Idaho	4–7	3–2	3rd	
Idaho:		20–24	11–8		
Total:		20–24			
National championship Conference title Conference division title or championship game berth
