= Mike Iupati =

Samoan-American football player (born 1987)

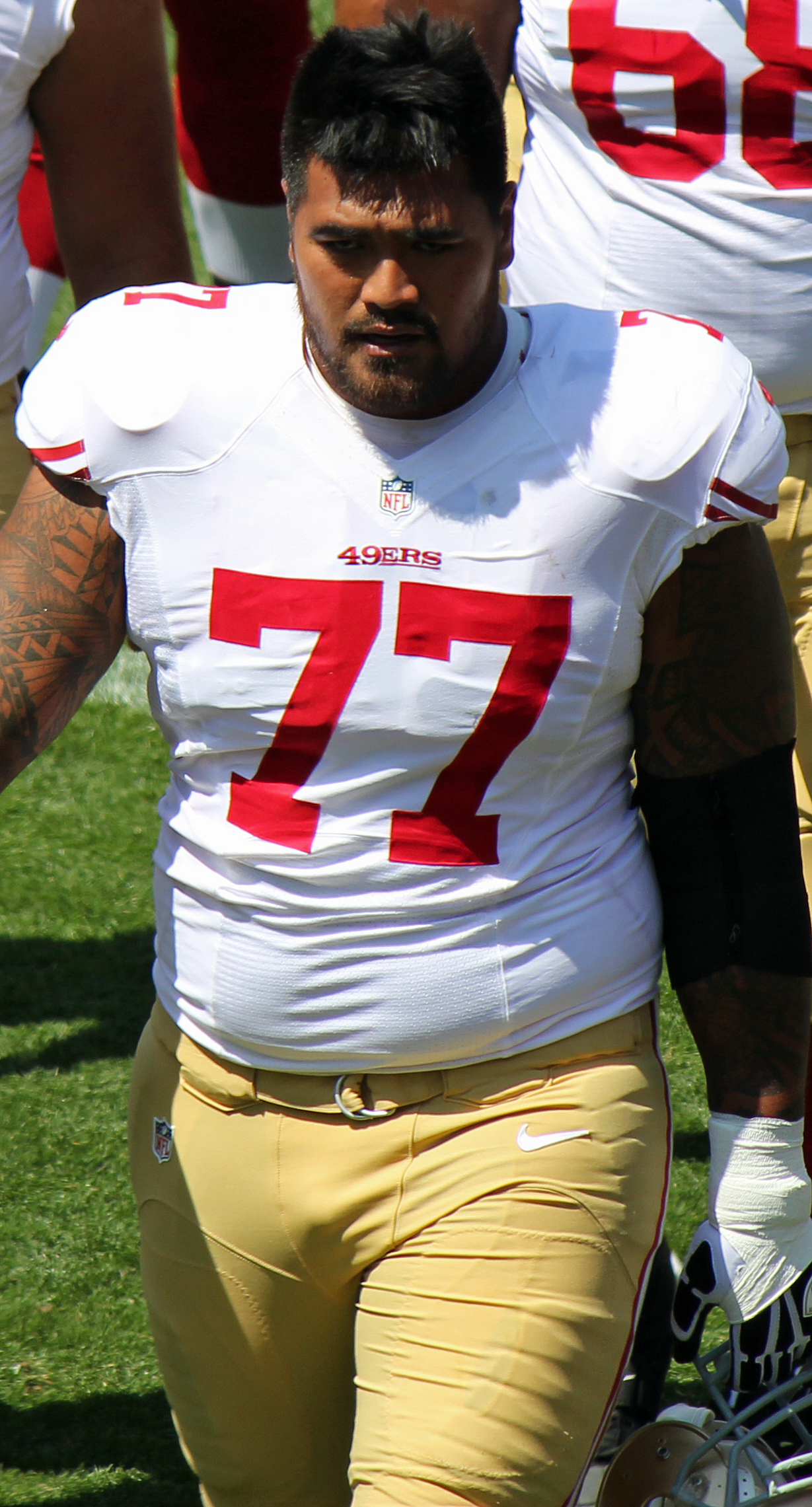
- Iupati with the San Francisco 49ers in 2012

Washington State Cougars
- Title: Offensive line coach

Personal information
- Born: May 12, 1987 (age 39); Vaitogi, American Samoa
- Listed height: 6 ft 5 in (1.96 m)
- Listed weight: 331 lb (150 kg)

Career information
- High school: Western (Anaheim, California, U.S.)
- College: Idaho (2006–2009)
- NFL draft: 2010: 1st round, 17th overall pick

Career history

Playing
- San Francisco 49ers (2010–2014); Arizona Cardinals (2015–2018); Seattle Seahawks (2019–2020)

Coaching
- Washington State (2025–present) Offensive line coach

Awards and highlights
- First-team All-Pro (2012); Second-team All-Pro (2015); 4× Pro Bowl (2012–2015); PFWA All-Rookie Team (2010); Polynesian Professional Football Player of the Year (2015); Madden Most Valuable Protectors Award (2012); Consensus All-American (2009); First-team All-WAC (2009); Second-team All-WAC (2008); Polynesian Football Hall of Fame (2022)

Career NFL statistics
- Games played: 140
- Games started: 139
- Stats at Pro Football Reference

Michael Iupati (/(ˌiː)juːˈpɑːti/ (EE-)yoo-PAH-tee; born May 12, 1987) is a Samoan-American former professional football player who was a guard for 11 seasons in the National Football League (NFL). A native of American Samoa, Iupati went to high school in southern California, played college football for the Idaho Vandals, and earned consensus All-American honors. Iupati was selected by the San Francisco 49ers in the first round of the 2010 NFL draft. He played five seasons with the 49ers, four with the Arizona Cardinals, and two with the Seattle Seahawks.

== Early life ==
Born and raised in Vaitogi, American Samoa, Iupati's family moved to Garden Grove, California, after he finished junior high school. He is the son of Aposetolo, a former mechanic at Los Angeles International Airport, and Belinda Iupati.

He attended Western High School in Anaheim, where he began playing football under the guidance of Odell Harrington, the school's half-Samoan football coach. His first chances to play came in his sophomore year, when senior Fili Moala injured his foot two games into the season. Playing lineman on both sides of the ball, Iupati received all-state and all-conference honors and served as a team captain. As a junior, he had 80 tackles and 12 sacks, and earned a first-team All-CIF selection. Iupati also competed in wrestling and track & field (52 ft 2 in (15.90 m) in the shot put).

Considered only a two-star recruit by both Rivals.com and Scout.com, Iupati was not ranked among the best offensive lineman prospects in the nation. Only a few schools offered him scholarships, among them Arizona and Texas–El Paso. However, those schools backed off because of Iupati's poor academic record, caused by a language barrier (English is his second language). Not having a high enough SAT score or sufficient grades, Iupati was planning to attend junior college until Johnny Nansen saw him in 2005, at a junior college's barbecue hosted for potential recruits. Nansen, then an assistant at Idaho under head coach Nick Holt, offered him a spot with the Vandals the next day and spent considerable time trying to convince Iupati and his family that the Western Athletic Conference university on the Palouse was a better choice than junior college.

== College career ==
Iupati attended the University of Idaho in Moscow, and played for the Vandals from 2006 through 2009. Because of academic problems, he was ineligible to play as a true freshman in 2005 and therefore unable to receive a scholarship or financial aid. His family took out a loan to pay non-resident tuition and room and board for his first year. He joined the Vandals football team in 2006, seeing action in a backup role as a redshirt freshman under head coach Dennis Erickson. As a sophomore in 2007, he started all 12 games at left guard, and became an impact player on the line for the struggling Vandals, under first-year head coach Robb Akey.

Iupati had off-season shoulder surgery, and did not return to the lineup until the third game of the 2008 season. He went on to start in 8 of the 10 games in which he played. He earned second-team All-WAC recognition in his junior year.

As a senior in 2009, Iupati was named to the preseason watch list for the Outland Trophy and the Lombardi Award. He was listed at No. 9 on Rivals.com's preseason interior lineman power ranking. Iupati started all twelve games in 2009 at left guard, played 807 snaps with 49 knockdowns and 21 pancake blocks. He did not allow a quarterback sack and just five defensive players he has blocked have even pressured quarterbacks Nathan Enderle or Brian Reader. He helped the Vandals record their first winning season since 1999, and their first bowl game win since 1998, as they beat the Bowling Green Falcons 43–42 in the Humanitarian Bowl.

On November 24, Iupati was named one of three finalists for the Outland Trophy, alongside Russell Okung and winner Ndamukong Suh. Iupati was a consensus All-American and also named first-team All-WAC. He was the first Idaho Vandal to receive All-American honors since John Yarno in 1976 and the first All-American from the WAC since Ryan Clady in 2007.

== Professional career ==
=== 2010 NFL draft ===
Iupati was considered one of the best offensive guard prospects available in the 2010 NFL draft. According to several scouts he projected as a late first or early second round selection. The Sporting News' Russ Lande reported that "nearly every scout who has evaluated Iupati on film says he has the footwork and athleticism to be an NFL left tackle." According to Sports Illustrated's Tony Pauline, Iupati was "the highest-rated guard since Steve Hutchinson," whom the Seattle Seahawks selected with the 17th pick in the 2001 NFL draft.

To prepare for the NFL Combine, Iupati relocated to Irvine and worked with former NFL lineman Jackie Slater at least four days a week, at both guard and tackle. By the time of the combine, Iupati was ranked as high as 15th best player overall on several draft boards as well as the only guard projected to go in the first two rounds by NFLDraftScout.com. Though Iupati only scored a 13 on the Wonderlic intelligence test, it did not stop the San Francisco 49ers from selecting Iupati in the first round with the 17th pick overall. It was the first time the 49ers used a first round pick on an interior offensive lineman since selecting Forrest Blue 15th overall in 1968. Iupati was the highest selected Idaho Vandal since Ray McDonald went 13th overall to the Washington Redskins in the 1967 NFL draft.

Pre-draft measurables
Height	Weight	Arm length	Hand span	40-yard dash	10-yard split	20-yard split	20-yard shuttle	Three-cone drill	Vertical jump	Broad jump	Bench press	Wonderlic
6 ft 5 1/8 in (1.96 m)	331 lb (150 kg)	34 3/4 in (0.88 m)	10 5/8 in (0.27 m)	5.26 s	1.84 s	3.01 s	4.93 s	7.85 s	27 1/2 in (0.70 m)	7 ft 8 in (2.34 m)	27 reps	13
All values from NFL Combine

=== San Francisco 49ers ===
On July 30, 2010, Iupati signed a five-year contract with the 49ers reportedly worth $18.25 million, with $10.8 million guaranteed. He started with the 49ers' first-string offense at left guard when David Baas was injured in training camp.

Iupati had a strong start to the 2010 season, not committing a penalty, or allowing a sack until Week 5. He made valuable contributions to the 49ers' running game, delivering downfield blocks. ESPN's Mike Sandos selected Iupati to his 2010 All-NFC West Team, while the Pro Football Writers Association named him one of their 2010 NFL All-Rookie selections.

In 2012, Iupati had an outstanding season and made the 2012 All-Pro first-team. He was also one of the six 49ers selected as Pro Bowl starters.

At the end of the 2012 season, Iupati and the 49ers appeared in Super Bowl XLVII. He started in the game, but the 49ers fell to the Baltimore Ravens by a score of 34–31.

=== Arizona Cardinals ===
On March 10, 2015, Iupati signed a five-year, $40 million contract with the Arizona Cardinals. On November 15, against the Seattle Seahawks, Iupati was placed in an ambulance on the field with a neck injury. He returned the week after against the 49ers, and went on to start every game for the remainder of the season. He was selected to his fourth Pro Bowl and Second-team All-Pro.

Iupati entered the 2017 season as the Cardinals starting left guard. He suffered a triceps injury in Week 1 and missed the next two games before being placed on injured reserve.

In 2018, Iupati started ten games at left guard, missing two with a back injury, before suffering a knee injury in Week 13. He was diagnosed with an MCL injury and was placed on injured reserve on December 3.

=== Seattle Seahawks ===
On March 14, 2019, Iupati signed a one-year contract with the Seattle Seahawks. Iupati was named a Pro Bowl alternate for the 2019 season.

Iupati re-signed with the Seahawks on April 21, 2020. He started 11 games at left guard, missing six due to injury.

On February 22, 2021, Iupati announced his retirement from the NFL after 11 seasons.

== Personal life ==
After a home game against Hawaii on October 17, 2009, Iupati met his future wife, Ashley Galeai, of Nampa, Idaho; her cousin played for the Warriors. Ashley and Mike Iupati married in February 2012, and have a son, KoaAli'i (born in August 2012). The couple resides near Star, Idaho.

Michael's sister, Fionna, a Site Registrar for Central Texas College, resides with her husband and kids in Fort Polk, Louisiana. His two brothers, Aposetolo Jr. and Andrew, both reside in Corona, California, and are currently in the field of providing personnel security. Iupati bought his parents a home in Corona, after making it to the NFL.

Iupati's younger brother, Andrew, played defensive tackle for the Oregon Ducks from 2007 to 2009, before transferring to Humboldt State, where he graduated in 2012. Andrew Iupati went undrafted in 2012, but attended San Francisco's three-day rookie minicamp in May 2012.
