= Steve Musseau =

American football player and coach (1923–1997)

Biographical details
- Born: July 15, 1923; Baton Rouge, Louisiana, U.S.
- Died: December 28, 1997 (aged 74); Everett, Washington, U.S.

Playing career
- 1941–1942: LSU

Coaching career (HC unless noted)
- 1955–1956: Mater Dei HS (CA)
- 1957–1961: Orange Coast
- 1962–1964: Idaho (assistant)
- 1965–1967: Idaho

Head coaching record
- Overall: 13–17 (college); 21–22–2 (junior college); 22-1 (high school)

Accomplishments and honors

Championships
- 1 Big Sky (1965); 1 Eastern Conference (1957); 1 CIF-SS Northern Group (1956)
- Military career
- Allegiance: United States
- Branch: U.S. Army
- Service years: 1943–1945
- Unit: Airborne infantry
- Conflicts: World War II

Stephen Joseph Musseau Jr. (July 15, 1923 – December 28, 1997) was an American football coach. He served as the head football coach at the University of Idaho for three seasons, from 1965 to 1967, compiling a record of 13–17. Following coaching, he was a motivational speaker and mental performance teacher.

== Early years ==
Born in Baton Rouge, Louisiana, Musseau played football at LSU until interrupted by World War II. While serving as a paratrooper in the U.S. Army, he incurred a badly fractured leg that ended his football career, but led him to his future wife, a nurse he met while recuperating. He returned to LSU to finish his degree, changing from engineering to pre-dental to education.

== Coaching ==
A high school football coach in Louisiana and California, Musseau was at Mater Dei High School for two seasons, leading the Monarchs football program to its first playoff appearance in 1955 followed by its first CIF Southern Section championship in 1956. Musseau had a combined record of 22 wins against one loss as head coach at Mater Dei before moving on to the junior college level in 1957. He was the head coach at Orange Coast College for five years when named to the staff at Idaho in 1962 by new head coach Dee Andros. Three years later, Andros left for Oregon State in 1965 with several assistants and offered him an assistant coaching position in Corvallis as well; Musseau was named head coach at Idaho within two days.

=== Idaho head coach ===
Musseau's 1965 Vandals, with fullback Thunder Ray McDonald, won the Battle of the Palouse over neighbor Washington State for the second straight year, this time on the road in Pullman, and finished at 5–5.

Although Idaho was a charter member was the Big Sky Conference in 1963, it had only played one conference game in football in the first two seasons, a previously scheduled game against Idaho State. Idaho was a "university division" program and a longtime member of the defunct PCC, while the other four football-playing members of the Big Sky were "college division" (Division II). Under Andros, Idaho viewed the six-team Big Sky as an answer to its basketball scheduling problems, as well as other sports, but had desired to continue as an independent at the top level in football.

Directed by the conference to comply, Idaho played its first full conference schedule in football in 1965 and was 3–1 for the first two seasons, but posted a disappointing 2–2 in the third. A November defeat at Weber State and non-conference blowout losses at Washington State (14–52) and Houston (6–77) closed out the 1967 season at 4–6 overall. Although his 13–17 (.433) record was better than each of the previous eight head coaches, pressure from alumni and boosters forced Musseau's resignation, despite a signed petition by the Vandal football players that he remain for a fourth year. His salary during his final year as head coach was $13,900. He stayed with the university in 1968, but outside the athletic department in a fund-raising role under the university president.

== After coaching ==
Following coaching, he was a motivational speaker, author, and mental performance teacher. For several seasons in the mid-1990s, Northwestern head coach Gary Barnett brought in Musseau as an inspirational mentor on adversity, including their 1995 run to their first Rose Bowl in nearly a half century. At the 1995 pre-season camp, Musseau dressed up in costume as Moses to help emphasize his key points. Two of Musseau's sons had played high school football for Barnett in the 1970s at Air Academy High School in Colorado Springs. After AAHS was beaten by its overmatched archrival, Barnett discovered that the rival team had been mentored by Musseau that week.

== Personal life ==
At the time of his hiring as head coach at Idaho in 1965, Musseau and his wife Yollanda were the parents of twelve children: ten sons and two daughters.

Musseau had ongoing problems with his health; following his first season as head coach at Idaho, he had a heart attack in early 1966 at age 42, and had several triple-bypass surgeries, as well as diabetes.

In his later years, Musseau was a resident of Marysville, Washington, north of Seattle. He died of heart failure in late 1997 at a nursing home in Everett.

== Head coaching record ==
=== College ===
Year	Team	Overall	Conference	Standing	Bowl/playoffs
Idaho Vandals (Big Sky Conference) (1965–1967)
1965	Idaho	5–4	3–1	T–1st	
1966	Idaho	4–6	3–1	2nd	
1967	Idaho	4–6	2–2	T–2nd	
Idaho:		13–17	8–4		
Total:		13–17			
National championship Conference title Conference division title or championship game berth

=== Junior college ===
Year	Team	Overall	Conference	Standing	Bowl/playoffs
Orange Coast Pirates (Eastern Conference) (1957–1961)
1957	Orange Coast	8–1	6–1	1st	
1958	Orange Coast	6–2–1	4–2–1	4th	
1959	Orange Coast	3–6	1–6	8th	
1960	Orange Coast	0–9	0–7	8th	
1961	Orange Coast	4–4–1	2–4–1	5th	
Orange Coast:		21–22–2	13–20–2		
Total:		21–22–2			
National championship Conference title Conference division title or championship game berth

=== High school ===
Year	Team	Regular Season					Postseason
Year	Team	Won	Lost	Ties	Win %	Finish	Result
1955	Mater Dei	10	1	0	.909	1st in Parochial League	CIF-SS Northern Group Quarterfinalists
1956	Mater Dei	12	0	0	1.000	1st in Parochial League	CIF-SS Northern Group Champions
Total		22	1	0	.957		
