= Y C McNease =

American football player and coach (1936–2023)

Biographical details
- Born: February 1, 1936; Raleigh, Mississippi, U.S.
- Died: March 7, 2023 (aged 87); Monticello, Florida, U.S.
- Education: Florida State University, 1963

Playing career
- 1961–1962: Florida State
- Positions: End, center, linebacker, fullback

Coaching career (HC unless noted)
- 1963: Florida State (assistant)
- 1964: Wichita State (assistant)
- 1965: Texas Western (assistant)
- 1966–1967: Michigan (assistant)
- 1968–1969: Idaho
- 1970: Kansas State (assistant)
- 1971–1972: UTEP (assistant)

Head coaching record
- Overall: 7–13

Accomplishments and honors

Championships
- 1 Big Sky (1968)

Y C McNease
- Military career
- Allegiance: United States
- Branch: U.S. Marine Corps
- Service years: 1956–1959
- Conflicts: Cold War

Y C McNease (February 1, 1936 – March 7, 2023) was an American college football coach. He was the head coach at the University of Idaho for the 1968 and 1969 seasons.

== Playing career ==
Born in Raleigh, Mississippi, McNease graduated from Leland High School in Leland in 1956, and joined the U.S. Marines. After his three years of military service, he attended junior college and transferred to Florida State, where he was on the roster for the 1961 and 1962 seasons as an end and center, and also played linebacker and fullback. Well into his twenties and losing his hair, McNease was nicknamed "Pappy" by his younger FSU teammates.

== Coaching career ==
Following his playing career, McNease was an assistant coach for five seasons at four schools; Florida State, Wichita State, Texas-El Paso, and Michigan. He was named the head coach at the University of Idaho in January 1968 at age 31, at an annual salary of $16,800. McNease succeeded Steve Musseau and placed a new emphasis on the passing game; the Vandals were 5–5 and 3–1 in the Big Sky in his first season, but they struggled with injuries and slipped to 2–8 with only one win in conference in 1969.

After just two seasons at Idaho, McNease was dismissed in May 1970 following spring practices. Though reasons were not fully disclosed by the university, it was attributed to his disciplinary tactics and player unrest. Additionally, an altercation reportedly occurred with a player in a Memorial Gym hallway and resulted in a ripped coat. In August 1971, over a year after his dismissal, McNease filed a $250,000 (later $1 million) breach of contract lawsuit in U.S. District Court against the university. An out-of-court settlement was reached in 1973 for just under $24,800.

McNease coached as an assistant for the next three seasons at Kansas State (1970) and back at UTEP, until his resignation in late October 1972, which followed the resignation of head coach Bobby Dobbs.

== After coaching ==
McNease left coaching and worked in the insurance and financial services industry, with stops in Athens, Georgia, and back on the Palouse in the Moscow-Pullman area in the early 1980s. As of 2010, he was a resident of Coeur d'Alene, Idaho. He spent his later years in Florida and died at age 87 at his home in Monticello.

== Name ==
His unique first name was simply "Y C" and unpunctuated; his last name is pronounced in three syllables (Mac-Nee-See).

== Head coaching record ==
Year	Team	Overall	Conference	Standing	Bowl/playoffs
Idaho Vandals (Big Sky Conference) (1968–1969)
1968	Idaho	5–5	3–1	T–1st	
1969	Idaho	2–8	1–3	4th	
Idaho:		7–13	4–4		
Total:		7–13			
National championship Conference title Conference division title or championship game berth
