= John Yarno =

American football player (born 1954)

No. 51
- Position: Center

Personal information
- Born: December 17, 1954 (age 71); Spokane, Washington, U.S.
- Listed height: 6 ft 5 in (1.96 m)
- Listed weight: 251 lb (114 kg)

Career information
- High school: Gonzaga (Spokane)
- College: Idaho (1973–1976)
- NFL draft: 1977: 4th round, 87th overall pick

Career history
- Seattle Seahawks (1977–1982); Denver Gold (1984)

Awards and highlights
- First-team All-American (1976); Idaho Vandals No. 56 retired

Career NFL statistics
- Games played: 74
- Games started: 62
- Fumble recoveries: 3
- Stats at Pro Football Reference

John Richard Yarno, Jr. (born December 17, 1954) is an American former professional football player who was a center for the Seattle Seahawks of the National Football League (NFL). He was selected in the fourth round of the 1977 NFL draft by the Seahawks with the 87th overall pick, and played for six seasons, from 1977 through 1982. Yarno played college football for the Idaho Vandals.

== Early life ==
Born and raised in Spokane, Washington, Yarno was one of six siblings and attended Gonzaga Prep through his junior year. He transferred to Ferris High School for his senior year and graduated in 1973. He was a second-team ("honorable mention") all-city selection at center in the fall of 1972, when the Saxons won their third consecutive city league championship. As a senior, Yarno was 6 ft 4 in (1.93 m) but under 200 lb (91 kg).

== College career ==
Left-handed and underweight for a center, Yarno was not highly recruited out of high school. He did not receive any offers from Pac-8 schools, only from Idaho and Boise State of the Big Sky conference. Idaho was a better fit for Yarno as it was closer to Spokane, a Division I program, and its offensive coordinator and line coach (Don Matthews) was a former head coach at Ferris and a UI alumnus. He also had familiarity with the college town of Moscow, the longtime residence of his maternal grandfather Lee Gregory, also a UI graduate. (Yarno's mother, Wanda (1925–62), died when he was not yet eight.) Yarno selected Idaho, then under fourth-year head coach Don Robbins, who had led Idaho to its then-best record of 8–3 in 1971.

In his freshman season of 1973, the Vandals went 4–7 for the second consecutive year and the coaching staff was dismissed, except for Ed Troxel, who was promoted to head coach. Yarno saw action in every game as a freshman, then became a three-year starter in his sophomore season of 1974 under Troxel and offensive coordinator Dennis Erickson. In his senior season of 1976, Idaho was 7–4 for their first winning season in five years. He was a unanimous selection as the conference player of the year on offense, the first for an interior lineman. Yarno was the first Vandal to be named to the Division I first-team All-American (AP), which included a prime-time television appearance on the Bob Hope Christmas Special on NBC on Monday, December 13. The All-America team was headlined by Heisman Trophy winner Tony Dorsett of Pittsburgh. Yarno was also selected to play in the East–West Shrine Game and the Senior Bowl. The University of Idaho retired his number 56 the following year.

During his senior season at Idaho, Yarno was listed at 6 ft 5 in (1.96 m) and 246 lb (112 kg). His younger brother George (1957–2016) was the nose tackle with neighboring Washington State in Pullman, and the two matched up often in the Battle of the Palouse in 1975 and 1976, both handily won by WSU at Martin Stadium.

== Professional career ==
Selected in the fourth round (87th overall) of the 1977 NFL draft, Yarno made the team as a rookie, but saw little action in 1977. He played six seasons with the Seahawks, the last five as the starting center, and endured three knee surgeries while a pro. Yarno became the starter in training camp in 1978, but suffered ligament damage to his left knee in the thirteenth game of the regular season, a road win over Oakland in late November. He regained his starting position for the 1979 season and played every offensive down. Yarno signed a three-year contract in April 1983, but was waived by new head coach Chuck Knox in late August after the acquisition of Blair Bush from Cincinnati.

Not picked up by another NFL team in 1983, Yarno and his brother George signed three-year contracts with the Denver Gold of the USFL for the 1984 spring season. After limited playing time at center and tight end in the USFL and no interest from NFL teams in 1984, he decided to retire from pro football in November at age 29.

== Personal life ==
After his third season in the NFL, Yarno married Sue Damrell in Spokane in June 1980. They had two children, Julie and Brian, and divorced in 2000. Yarno married Sandy Hurtig in 2003 and they reside in Coeur d'Alene, Idaho.
