= Ray McDonald (running back) =

American football player (1944–1993)

No. 32, 35
- Position: Running back

Personal information
- Born: May 7, 1944; McKinney, Texas, U.S.
- Died: May 4, 1993 (aged 48); Dallas, Texas, U.S.
- Listed height: 6 ft 4 in (1.93 m)
- Listed weight: 248 lb (112 kg)

Career information
- High school: Caldwell (ID)
- College: Idaho
- NFL draft: 1967: 1st round, 13th overall pick

Career history
- Washington Redskins (1967–1968); Virginia Sailors (1968); Roanoke Buckskins (1969-1971)

Awards and highlights
- 2× Second-team All-American (1965, 1966); Second-team All-PCC (1964)

Career NFL statistics
- Rushing yards: 223
- Rushing average: 4.3
- Receptions: 10
- Receiving yards: 60
- Total touchdowns: 4
- Stats at Pro Football Reference

Ray Douglas McDonald (May 7, 1944 – May 4, 1993) was an American professional football player who was a running back in the National Football League (NFL) for the Washington Redskins for two seasons, from 1967 to 1968.

== Early life ==
McDonald was born in McKinney, a segregated suburb of Dallas. After years in McKinney, he began high school in Alamogordo, New Mexico, and then moved to Caldwell, Idaho, after his sophomore year. A three-sport star for the Cougars for two years, he graduated from Caldwell High School in 1963. At 6 ft 2 in (1.88 m) and 220 lb (100 kg), he was a high school All-American and was compared to NFL great Jim Brown.

== College career ==
McDonald enrolled at the University of Idaho in Moscow in 1963 and his family moved north from Caldwell to nearby Lewiston. On the mandatory freshman team his first semester, he led the Vandals to convincing wins over the freshman teams of Washington (32–18) and Washington State (36–0). (Freshmen were ineligible for NCAA varsity participation until the early 1970s.) McDonald missed the first three games of his sophomore season after tearing his Achilles tendon in a pick-up basketball game in late June. As a speedy fullback for the varsity as a sophomore, he was dubbed "Thunder Ray" after his first Battle of the Palouse game the first Vandal victory over neighboring WSU in a decade. (Idaho repeated over the Cougars in Pullman in 1965 for the first time in forty years, and would've swept three straight, but lost a late lead in the Moscow mud in 1966).

As a senior in 1966, he led the nation in rushing with 1,329 yards, capping it with 255 yards in his final game. At an imposing 6 ft 4 in (1.93 m) and 248 lb (112 kg), he was the dominant player in the Big Sky Conference, and was the leading rusher for Idaho in all three years of eligibility (1964–66), averaging over 100 yards rushing per game for his collegiate career. He rushed for 36 touchdowns and 2,916 yards in 27 games played as a Vandal, an average of 108 yards per game.

McDonald was timed in the 100-yard dash at 9.9 seconds and was a first-team All-American. He was also a Big Sky Conference Champion in the shot put (1965 - 56'0.75"/17.09m, 1966 - 56'6"/17.22m) and discus (1965, 169'7"/51.69m) and was a national-class hurdler on the Vandal track team.

McDonald played both offense and defense in at the East–West Shrine Game, as well as the piano at Shriners Hospital, and saw significant playing time at fullback in the Senior Bowl the following week.

== Professional career ==
McDonald was selected in the first round of the 1967 NFL/AFL draft by the Washington Redskins, as the 13th overall pick, a personal choice by owner Edward Bennett Williams. In his second game, McDonald rushed for 98 yards on 15 carries and scored three touchdowns in Washington's 30-10 victory at New Orleans. But McDonald scored only once more during the season as he totaled just 52 rushing attempts for 223 yards. Though he signed a three-year, guaranteed contract for $100,000, McDonald was released in September 1968, prior to the start of the regular season.

== Personal life ==
In 1968, McDonald was arrested by Washington, D.C. police for having sex with a man in public. Injuries also played a part in cutting his career short, and by 1969 he was out of pro football.

McDonald eventually became a junior high music teacher. After an extended battle, he died of complications due to AIDS at Parkland Hospital in Dallas, on May 4, 1993, three days before his 49th birthday, with a body weight less than half of his NFL playing weight. The cause of death was originally reported as complications from sickle cell anemia.

== See also ==
- Homosexuality in American football
- List of college football yearly rushing leaders
