= 1981 Little All-America college football team =

American college football all-star team

The 1981 Little All-America college football team is composed of college football players from small colleges and universities who were selected by the Associated Press (AP) as the best players at each position. This would be the first year to feature special teams selections.

== First team ==
Position	Player	Team
Offense
Quarterback	Mike Machurek	Idaho State
Running back	Alvin Holder	Peru State
Running back	Milson Jones	North Dakota
Running back	Paris Wicks	Youngstown State
Wide receiver	Dwight Walker	Nicholls State
Tight end	Gary McCauley	Clarion State (PA)
Tackle	Mike Fields	Jackson State
Tackle	Bob Speights	Boston University
Guard	Mike Broome	Hillsdale
Guard	Kevin Greve	Eastern Kentucky
Center	Mike Udovich	Millersville State
Defense
Defensive end	Donnie Evans	Western Kentucky
Defensive end	Booker Reese	Bethune–Cookman
Defensive tackle	Randy Trautman	Boise State
Defensive tackle	Malcolm Taylor	Tennessee State
Middle guard	Bob Jackson	Puget Sound
Linebacker	Andre Robinson	Grambling State
Linebacker	Joe Skladany	Lafayette
Linebacker	Clayton Weishuhn	Angelo State
Defensive back	William Dillon	Virginia Union
Defensive back	George Floyd	Eastern Kentucky
Defensive back	Wayne Schluchter	North Dakota State
Special Teams
Kicker	Tony Zendejas	Nevada
Punter	Case deBruijn	Idaho State

== See also ==
- 1981 College Football All-America Team
