= Robb Akey =

American football player and coach (born 1966)

- Akey in 2010

Biographical details
- Born: July 24, 1966 (age 60); Colorado Springs, Colorado, U.S.

Playing career
- 1984–1987: Weber State
- Positions: Defensive lineman, linebacker, tight end

Coaching career (HC unless noted)
- 1988–1994: Weber State (ST/DL/RC)
- 1995: Northern Arizona (ST)
- 1996–1998: Northern Arizona (DC)
- 1999–2002: Washington State (DL)
- 2003–2006: Washington State (DC)
- 2007–2012: Idaho
- 2014: Minnesota Vikings (ADL)
- 2015–2016: Washington Redskins (DL)
- 2017: Florida (DA)
- 2017: Florida (interim DL)
- 2019–2024: Central Michigan (DC)
- 2025: Oregon State (SAHC)
- 2025: Oregon State (interim HC)

Head coaching record
- Overall: 22–53
- Bowls: 1–0

Robb Alan Akey (born July 24, 1966) is an American college football coach who was most recently the interim head coach at Oregon State University. The Beavers promoted him to interim head coach in 2025, following the firing of Trent Bray after an 0–7 start to the season. Akey previously served as the defensive coordinator at Central Michigan University from 2019 to 2024. Akey served as the head football coach at the University of Idaho from 2007 to 2012.

== Early years ==
Born and raised in Colorado Springs, Colorado, Akey graduated from Roy J. Wasson High School in 1984, having lettered in three sports. Akey played at outside linebacker, defensive end, and tight end for head coach Mike Price at Weber State, where he was an all-Big Sky and honorable mention All-American at defensive end in his senior season of 1987.

== Coaching career ==
Akey was a college assistant coach for 19 seasons, beginning in 1988 as assistant defensive line coach at Weber State. From 1989 to 1994, Akey was defensive line coach, recruiting coordinator, and special teams coordinator at Weber State. From 1995 to 1998, Akey was an assistant at Northern Arizona, first as special teams coordinator and linebackers coach in 1995 then as defensive coordinator from 1996 to 1998.

In 1999, Akey reunited with Mike Price and began an eight-year stint as an assistant at Washington State. After being defensive line coach from 1999 to 2002, Akey added defensive coordinator to his duties in 2003 under new head Bill Doba, who was previously defensive coordinator under Price.

Akey became Idaho's fourth head coach in 37 months when he was hired on December 20, 2006, by athletic director Rob Spear. He was the first Idaho head coach since Jerry Davitch (1978–81) without previous ties to the Vandals, either as a former player or assistant coach.

Akey succeeded Dennis Erickson, who left his second stint at Idaho after just ten months for Arizona State of the Pac-10. Erickson was preceded by Nick Holt, who voluntarily departed after only two seasons, compiling nine losses in each. Tom Cable was fired in late 2003, after four disappointing seasons (11–35, .239).

When hired as the Vandals' new head coach, Akey stated that he was opposed to holding the Battle of the Palouse rivalry game with Washington State every year. He said he preferred it as a "once-in-a-while thing," to minimize possible "off-field" problems between rival programs only eight miles apart. The annual game was revived in 1998 and played for ten consecutive years; it was last played in Akey's first season of 2007 and was renewed for a game in 2013.

Akey led the Vandals to victory in their first bowl game in more than a decade in December 2009, but his tenure ended in 2012 on October 21, when Idaho fired him following a 70–28 loss to Louisiana Tech, moving the team's overall record to 1–7 for the season. He achieved a 20–50 (.286) record while head coach at Idaho, and the Vandals lost their final four games in 2012 after his termination.

In 2025, Akey joined the staff at Oregon State University as special assistant to head coach Trent Bray. Akey took charge of special teams after the dismissal of Jamie Christian in early October. A week later, Bray was fired after going winless in the first seven games and Akey was named interim head coach for the remainder of the season.

== Head coaching record ==
| Year | Team | Overall | Conference | Standing | Bowl/playoffs |
|---|---|---|---|---|---|
Idaho Vandals (Western Athletic Conference) (2007–2012)
| 2007 | Idaho | 1–11 | 0–8 | 9th | |
| 2008 | Idaho | 2–10 | 1–7 | 9th | |
| 2009 | Idaho | 8–5 | 4–4 | 4th | W Humanitarian |
| 2010 | Idaho | 6–7 | 3–5 | 6th | |
| 2011 | Idaho | 2–10 | 1–6 | 8th | |
| 2012 | Idaho | 1–7 | 1–2 | | |
| Idaho: | | 20–50 | 10–32 | | |
Oregon State Beavers (Pac-12 Conference) (2025–present)
| 2025 | Oregon State | 2–3 (Note: Akey succeeded Trent Bray with five games remaining) | 0–0 | | |
| Oregon State: | | 2–3 | 0–0 | | |
| Total: | | 22–53 | | | |
