= Battle of the Palouse =

American college sports rivalry

Coordinates: 46.732°N 117.16°W

Location in the United States
Locations of Washington State and Idaho on the Palouse

The Battle of the Palouse refers to an athletic rivalry in the northwest United States, between the Vandals of the University of Idaho and Cougars of Washington State University.

The two land-grant universities are less than eight miles (13 km) apart on the rural Palouse in the Inland Northwest; Idaho's campus in Moscow is nearly on the Idaho–Washington border, and Washington State's campus is directly west in Pullman, linked by Washington State Route 270 and the Bill Chipman Palouse Trail. The two schools' most prominent rivalry was in football, but this has shifted to men's basketball.

== Football ==
Battle of the Palouse
- Idaho Vandals Washington State Cougars
- Sport: College football
- First meeting: November 17, 1894; 132 years ago WSC, 10–0
- Latest meeting: August 30, 2025; Washington State, 13–10
- Next meeting: September 4, 2027

Statistics
- Total meetings: 94
- All-time series: Washington State leads, 74–17–3 (.803)
- Largest victory: Washington State, 84–27 (1975)
- Longest win streak: Washington State, 20 (1928–1949)
- Longest unbeaten streak: Washington State, 26 (1926–1953)
- Current win streak: Washington State, 11 (2001–present)

=== Series history ===
The first game was played 132 years ago in November 1894 and resulted in a win for Washington State. The game in 1898 was not played because Idaho had an ineligible ringer from Lapwai, David McFarland, a recent All-American from Carlisle. The Vandals' first-ever forward pass was attempted against the Cougars in 1907: it was completed for a touchdown from a drop-kick formation in the fourth quarter and led to a 5–4 victory.

Washington State has dominated the local rivalry, holding a 74–16–3 (.812) lead; the record since 1926 is even more dominant, with a 59–5–2 (.909) advantage for the Cougars. The longest winning streak for Idaho was three games (1923–25), and has only five victories since that three-peat (1954, 1964, 1965, 1999, & 2000) and two ties (1927, 1950) to offset the 58 losses.

The games were skipped in 1969 and 1971, notably for Idaho as the 1971 Vandals posted one of the best records (8–3) in school history, while WSU was 4–7. The rivalry became increasingly one-sided as WSU dominated in the 1970s (except for 1974) and the original series ended, following the 1978 game. From 1979 to 1997, the game was played just twice (1982, 1989) until the 10-year renewal from 1998–2007. Since their last wins in 1999 and 2000, Idaho has been physically outmatched in most of the ten games; the game has been played three times since 2007, in 2013, 2016, and 2022.

As two schools are in close proximity, there was a tradition called "Walkathon" from 1938 to 1968; a week following the game, students of the losing school walked from their campus to the winners', then received rides back home from the winning side. This has frequently been misreported as students walking back to their own campus immediately following the game. In 1954, the walk made national news when about 2,000 students from Washington State College made the trek east from Pullman to Moscow after the Cougars lost to Idaho for the first time in 29 years.

In a span of less than five months, from November 1969 to April 1970, both schools' aged wooden stadiums (Idaho's Neale Stadium and WSU's Rogers Field) burned down due to suspected arson. The WSU–Idaho game in 1970 was dubbed the "Displaced Bowl", which was held in Joe Albi Stadium in Spokane on September 19. The Cougars won the game (their only win that season), as well as the next ten against the Vandals. This was the first in the rivalry played on AstroTurf, which was new to Joe Albi that season.

In 1978, the NCAA split Division I football in two: I-A (now FBS) and I-AA (now FCS). Washington State was in Division I-A as part of the Pac-10 Conference and Idaho downgraded to I-AA as part of the Big Sky Conference, whose other football members moved up from Division II. In the late 1970s, I-A football programs were allowed 50% more scholarships and twice as many assistant coaches as I-AA teams. During the years they were in different divisions, the schools met only twice (1982 in Spokane and 1989 in Pullman). In 1996, Idaho moved back up to Division I-A in the Big West Conference, and Idaho and WSU rekindled their century-old rivalry. Since the rivalry was reinstated in 1998, every game has been played at Martin Stadium in Pullman, except for the matchup in 2003, which was played at Seattle's Seahawks Stadium. The last game played on the Idaho side of the border was 60 years ago in 1966, a come-from-behind 14–7 Cougar victory on a very muddy field to prevent a Vandal three-peat.

=== Future of rivalry ===
After ten years of the renewed rivalry, Vandal head coach Robb Akey, previously WSU's defensive coordinator, said in 2008 that he preferred the game not be played every year, instead saying he would prefer it as a "once-in-a-while thing." Only one game was played during Akey's tenure, in his first season in 2007, and he was fired in October 2012. The meeting in 2013 on September 21 was a one-year revival, and WSU won 56–6 in 2016. Because of the difficulty of scheduling as an isolated FBS independent, Idaho returned to FCS and the Big Sky in 2018. There was a meeting scheduled for 2020, but it was canceled due to complications arising from the COVID-19 pandemic; the teams played next in 2022, a 24–17 Cougar win and then again in 2025, another Cougar win of 13-10. Future meetings are currently scheduled for 2027, 2029, and 2033.

=== Game results ===
Idaho victories	Washington State victories	Tie games

No.	Date	Location	Winner	Score
1	November 18, 1894	Moscow, ID	Washington Agricultural	10–0
2	November 9, 1895	Pullman, WA	Washington Agricultural	10–4
3	October 28, 1899	Pullman, WA	Washington Agricultural	11–0
4	October 25, 1901	Moscow, ID	Idaho	5–0
5	October 24, 1902	Pullman, WA	Washington Agricultural	17–0
6	October 23, 1903	Moscow, ID	Idaho	32–0
7	October 21, 1904	Pullman, WA	Idaho	5–0
8	November 10, 1905	Moscow, ID	Idaho	5–0
9	November 9, 1906	Pullman, WA	Washington State	10–0
10	November 8, 1907	Moscow, ID	Idaho	5–4
11	November 14, 1908	Pullman, WA	Tie	4–4
12	November 5, 1909	Spokane, WA	Washington State	18–0
13	October 21, 1910	Pullman, WA	Idaho	9–5
14	October 20, 1911	Moscow, ID	Washington State	17–0
15	October 18, 1912	Pullman, WA	Idaho	13–0
16	October 17, 1913	Moscow, ID	Idaho	3–0
17	November 7, 1914	Pullman, WA	Washington State	3–0
18	October 30, 1915	Moscow, ID	Washington State	41–0
19	November 4, 1916	Pullman, WA	Washington State	31–0
20	November 3, 1917	Moscow, ID	Washington State	19–0
21	December 7, 1918	Moscow, ID	Idaho	7–6
22	November 1, 1919	Pullman, WA	Washington State	37–0
23	October 15, 1920	Moscow, ID	Washington State	14–7
24	October 21, 1921	Pullman, WA	Washington State	20–3
25	October 20, 1922	Moscow, ID	Washington State	18–9
26	October 19, 1923	Pullman, WA	Idaho	14–0
27	October 17, 1924	Moscow, ID	Idaho	19–3
28	October 17, 1925	Pullman, WA	Idaho	7–6
29	November 6, 1926	Moscow, ID	Washington State	6–0
30	November 11, 1927	Pullman, WA	Tie	7–7
31	November 3, 1928	Moscow, ID	Washington State	26–0
32	November 9, 1929	Pullman, WA	Washington State	41–7
33	November 8, 1930	Moscow, ID	Washington State	33–7
34	November 7, 1931	Pullman, WA	Washington State	9–8
35	November 5, 1932	Pullman, WA	Washington State	12–0
36	November 11, 1933	Moscow, ID	Washington State	14–6
37	November 10, 1934	Pullman, WA	Washington State	19–0
38	November 9, 1935	Moscow, ID	Washington State	6–0
39	October 10, 1936	Moscow, ID	Washington State	14–0
40	October 2, 1937	Pullman, WA	Washington State	13–0
41	November 12, 1938	Moscow, ID	Washington State	12–0
42	November 11, 1939	Pullman, WA	Washington State	21–13
43	November 2, 1940	Moscow, ID	Washington State	26–0
44	November 8, 1941	Pullman, WA	Washington State	26–0
45	November 14, 1942	Moscow, ID	#14 Washington State	7–0
46	September 29, 1945	Moscow, ID	Washington State	43–12
47	October 27, 1945	Pullman, WA	Washington State	21–0
48	October 5, 1946	Pullman, WA	Washington State	32–0

No.	Date	Location	Winner	Score
49	October 4, 1947	Moscow, ID	Washington State	7–0
50	October 30, 1948	Pullman, WA	Washington State	19–14
51	October 15, 1949	Moscow, ID	Washington State	25–13
52	October 28, 1950	Pullman, WA	Tie	7–7
53	November 10, 1951	Moscow, ID	#17 Washington State	9–6
54	November 1, 1952	Pullman, WA	Washington State	36–6
55	October 17, 1953	Moscow, ID	Washington State	30–13
56	October 23, 1954	Pullman, WA	Idaho	10–0
57	October 15, 1955	Moscow, ID	Washington State	9–0
58	October 6, 1956	Moscow, ID	Washington State	33–19
59	November 16, 1957	Pullman, WA	Washington State	21–13
60	October 11, 1958	Moscow, ID	Washington State	8–0
61	October 24, 1959	Pullman, WA	Washington State	27–5
62	November 12, 1960	Moscow, ID	Washington State	18–7
63	October 14, 1961	Pullman, WA	Washington State	34–0
64	November 17, 1962	Moscow, ID	Washington State	22–14
65	November 2, 1963	Pullman, WA	Washington State	14–10
66	October 24, 1964	Moscow, ID	Idaho	28–13
67	October 2, 1965	Pullman, WA	Idaho	17–13
68	October 22, 1966	Moscow, ID	Washington State	14–7
69	November 11, 1967	Pullman, WA	Washington State	52–14
70	September 21, 1968	Spokane, WA	Washington State	14–7
71	September 19, 1970	Spokane, WA	Washington State	44–16
72	October 7, 1972	Pullman, WA	Washington State	35–14
73	September 29, 1973	Pullman, WA	Washington State	51–24
74	September 21, 1974	Pullman, WA	Washington State	17–10
75	November 15, 1975	Pullman, WA	Washington State	84–27
76	October 2, 1976	Pullman, WA	Washington State	45–6
77	November 12, 1977	Pullman, WA	Washington State	45–17
78	September 16, 1978	Pullman, WA	Washington State	28–0
79	September 11, 1982	Spokane, WA	Washington State	34–14
80	September 2, 1989	Pullman, WA	Washington State	41–7
81	September 19, 1998	Pullman, WA	Washington State	24–16
82	September 18, 1999	Pullman, WA	Idaho	28–17
83	September 23, 2000	Pullman, WA	Idaho	38–34
84	August 30, 2001	Pullman, WA	Washington State	36–7
85	September 7, 2002	Pullman, WA	#11 Washington State	49–14
86	August 30, 2003	Seattle, WA	Washington State	25–0
87	September 18, 2004	Pullman, WA	Washington State	49–8
88	September 1, 2005	Pullman, WA	Washington State	38–26
89	September 9, 2006	Pullman, WA	Washington State	56–10
90	September 15, 2007	Pullman, WA	Washington State	45–28
91	September 21, 2013	Pullman, WA	Washington State	42–0
92	September 17, 2016	Pullman, WA	Washington State	56–6
93	September 3, 2022	Pullman, WA	Washington State	24–17
94	August 30, 2025	Pullman, WA	Washington State	13–10
Series: Washington State leads 74–17–3

- Both were members of the Pacific Coast Conference; the Battle of the Palouse was a conference game from 1922 through 1958.
- Idaho was a division below WSU in 1967–68 (College division) and 1978–95 (Division I-AA); Idaho returned to FCS in 2018.
- Prior to 1959, WSU was WSC.
- The only one to serve as head coach for both programs is Dennis Erickson, who lost to the Cougars twice while at Idaho (1982, 2006);
  the game was not played when he was at WSU (1987, 1988).
- The 1918 game was non-varsity, composed of Student Army Training Corps (SATC) players. After the Armistice of November 11
  ending World War I, a limited schedule was played; Idaho defeated Washington State's SATC team 7–6 in Moscow on December 7.

=== Coaching records ===
Since 1919

==== Idaho ====
Head coach	Team	Games	Seasons	Wins	Losses	Ties	Pct.
Ralph Hutchinson	Idaho	1	1919	0	1	0	.000
Thomas Kelley	Idaho	2	1920–1921	0	2	0	.000
Matty Mathews	Idaho	4	1922–1925	3	1	0	.750
Charles Erb	Idaho	3	1926–1928	0	2	1	.167
Leo Calland	Idaho	6	1929–1934	0	6	0	.000
Ted Bank	Idaho	6	1935–1940	0	6	0	.000
Francis Schmidt	Idaho	2	1941–1942	0	2	0	.000
Babe Brown	Idaho	3	1945–1946	0	3	0	.000
Dixie Howell	Idaho	4	1947–1950	0	3	1	.125
Babe Curfman	Idaho	3	1951–1953	0	3	0	.000
Skip Stahley	Idaho	8	1954–1961	1	7	0	.125
Dee Andros	Idaho	3	1962–1964	1	2	0	.333
Steve Musseau	Idaho	3	1965–1967	1	2	0	.333
Y C McNease	Idaho	1	1968–1969	0	1	0	.000
Don Robbins	Idaho	3	1970–1973	0	3	0	.000
Ed Troxel	Idaho	4	1974–1977	0	4	0	.000
Jerry Davitch	Idaho	1	1978–1981	0	1	0	.000
Dennis Erickson (a)	Idaho	1	1982–1985	0	1	0	.000
Keith Gilbertson	Idaho	0	1986–1988				
John L. Smith	Idaho	1	1989–1994	0	1	0	.000
Chris Tormey	Idaho	2	1995–1999	1	1		.500
Tom Cable	Idaho	4	2000–2003	1	3		.250
Nick Holt	Idaho	2	2004–2005	0	2		.000
Dennis Erickson (b)	Idaho	1	2006	0	1		.000
Robb Akey	Idaho	1	2007–2012	0	1		.000
Paul Petrino	Idaho	2	2013–2021	0	2		.000
Jason Eck	Idaho	1	2022–2024	0	1		.000
Thomas Ford	Idaho	1	2025–	0	1		.000

- Won first attempt: Stahley (1954), Musseau (1965), Cable (2000)
- Won final attempt: Mathews (1925), Andros (1964), Tormey (1999)
- Only Idaho coach with more than one win was Mathews, with three straight (1923, 1924, 1925)

==== Washington State ====
Head coach	Team	Games	Seasons	Wins	Losses	Ties	Pct.
Gus Welch	Washington State	4	1919–1922	4	0	0	1.000
Albert Exendine	Washington State	3	1923–1925	0	3	0	.000
Babe Hollingbery	Washington State	17	1926–1942	16	0	1	.971
Phil Sarboe	Washington State	6	1945–1949	6	0	0	1.000
Forest Evashevski	Washington State	2	1950–1951	1	0	1	.750
Al Kircher	Washington State	4	1952–1955	3	1	0	.750
Jim Sutherland	Washington State	8	1956–1963	8	0	0	1.000
Bert Clark	Washington State	4	1964–1967	2	2	0	.500
Jim Sweeney	Washington State	6	1968–1975	6	0	0	1.000
Jackie Sherrill	Washington State	1	1976	1	0	0	1.000
Warren Powers	Washington State	1	1977	1	0	0	1.000
Jim Walden	Washington State	2	1978–1986	2	0	0	1.000
Dennis Erickson	Washington State	0	1987–1988				
Mike Price	Washington State	6	1989–2002	4	2	0	.667
Bill Doba	Washington State	5	2003–2007	5	0		1.000
Paul Wulff	Washington State	0	2008–2011				
Mike Leach	Washington State	2	2012–2019	2	0		1.000
Nick Rolovich	Washington State	0	2020–2021				
Jake Dickert	Washington State	1	2021–2024	1	0		1.000
Jimmy Rogers	Washington State	1	2025–	1	0		1.000

- Last tie was in 1950, overtime began in 1996 in Division I-A (none through 2025)
- Two games were played in 1945; no games in 1943, 1944, 1969, 1971
- After 1978, except for resumption of 1998–2007, games were scheduled intermittently (1982, 1989, 2013, 2016, 2022, 2025, 2027)

== Men's basketball ==
Battle of the Palouse
- Idaho; Vandals Washington State Cougars
- Sport: College basketball
- First meeting: January 13, 1906; 120 years ago Washington State, 28–11
- Latest meeting: November 3, 2025; Idaho, 83–81, in Pullman
- Next meeting: November 27, 2026; Pullman, Washington

Statistics
- Total meetings: 280
- All-time series: Washington State leads, 169–111 (.604)
- Largest victory: Washington State, 109–61 (November 18, 2021)
- Longest win streak: Washington State, 12 (1915–1917)
- Current win streak: Idaho, 1 (2025–present)

Although the Battle of the Palouse in football had waned by the 1980s, Idaho and Washington State men's basketball teams have played each other annually since 1906 in a series that continues. From 1922 through the 1958–59 season, both were members of the Pacific Coast Conference, and both were independents for the next several years after it disbanded. Four games per season were played in these years, sometimes five; during the Gus Johnson season of 1962–63, Idaho won four of five.

Washington State has a 168–110 (.604) lead in the series through the November 2023 game in Pullman, which the Cougars won 84–59. Idaho had taken three of the previous four; the Vandals' win in December 2014 was their first over the Cougars since 2002 and the first in Pullman since 1989.

The rivalry in basketball reached its peak in the early 1980s, when alumnus Don Monson was Idaho's head coach and WSU was led by George Raveling. The game in early December 1982 at the Kibbie Dome in Moscow established a new attendance record of 11,000 for an Idaho home game; the Vandals won in overtime for their third straight win over the Cougars and 37th consecutive win at home. Idaho was coming off a 27–3 season in 1982 in which it was ranked in the top ten and reached the Sweet Sixteen (and Monson was named Kodak coach of the year). The Cougars went on to finish second in the Pac-10 in the 1983 regular season, and advanced to the second round of the NCAA tournament, falling to #1 seed Virginia in Boise to finish at 26–6. Both coaches left at the end of the season; Monson for Oregon and Raveling for Iowa.

=== Game results ===
Since 1950: Washington State leads, 76–50 (.603)

Idaho victories	Washington State victories

No.	Date	Location	Winner	Score
1	January 28, 1950	Moscow	Washington State	63–40
2	February 10, 1950	Pullman	Idaho	51–50
3	March 3, 1950	Moscow	Washington State	39–34
4	March 4, 1950	Pullman	Idaho	50–45^{3OT}
5	January 12, 1951	Moscow	Idaho	43–42
6	January 13, 1951	Pullman	Washington State	41–40
7	February 23, 1951	Pullman	Washington State	51–40
8	February 24, 1951	Moscow	Idaho	48–46
9	January 12, 1952	Pullman	Washington State	62–46
10	January 14, 1952	Moscow	Idaho	57–49
11	February 1, 1952	Pullman	Idaho	57–52
12	February 2, 1952	Pullman	Idaho	62–55
13	February 3, 1953	Pullman	Idaho	71–53
14	January 30, 1953	Moscow	Idaho	69–51
15	February 17, 1953	Pullman	Idaho	72–69
16	February 24, 1953	Moscow	Idaho	75–62
17	January 19, 1954	Moscow	Idaho	71–53
18	January 29, 1954	Pullman	Washington State	71–61
19	February 16, 1954	Moscow	Idaho	45–42
20	February 23, 1954	Pullman	Washington State	56–44
21	December 29, 1954	Seattle	Washington State	64–56
22	January 18, 1955	Pullman	Washington State	53–39
23	January 28, 1955	Moscow	Idaho	75–73^{OT}
24	January 29, 1955	Pullman	Washington State	68–60
25	February 22, 1955	Moscow	Idaho	77–59
26	March 9, 1956	Moscow	Idaho	78–62
27	March 10, 1956	Pullman	Idaho	78–61
28	January 15, 1957	Pullman	Washington State	73–70
29	January 22, 1957	Moscow	Idaho	69–57
30	January 17, 1958	Pullman	Idaho	85–67
31	January 18, 1958	Moscow	Washington State	77–69
32	January 16, 1959	Moscow	Idaho	56–55
33	January 17, 1959	Pullman	Washington State	61–53
34	December 8, 1959	Pullman	Washington State	61–53
35	December 29, 1959	Portland	Idaho	75–74
36	February 13, 1960	Pullman	Washington State	61–53
37	February 20, 1960	Moscow	Washington State	77–69
38	December 9, 1960	Moscow	Idaho	56–55
39	December 10, 1960	Pullman	Washington State	64–56
40	January 28, 1961	Moscow	Idaho	85–67
41	February 21, 1961	Pullman	Washington State	77–63
42	December 30, 1961	Portland	Idaho	75–74
43	January 9, 1962	Pullman	Washington State	65–60
44	February 2, 1962	Moscow	Idaho	75–66
45	February 3, 1962	Pullman	Washington State	63–62
46	February 27, 1962	Moscow	Idaho	65–60
47	December 20, 1962	Moscow	Idaho	94–57
48	December 29, 1962	Portland	Idaho	64–63
49	January 8, 1963	Pullman	Idaho	75–67
50	January 15, 1963	Moscow	Idaho	72–65
51	February 1, 1963	Pullman	Washington State	66–57
52	December 10, 1963	Pullman	Washington State	85–68
53	December 1, 1964	Moscow	Idaho	76–54
54	December 15, 1964	Pullman	Washington State	75–70
55	December 21, 1965	Moscow	Washington State	101–86
56	January 21, 1966	Pullman	Washington State	115–91
57	December 21, 1966	Moscow	Idaho	49–47
58	January 28, 1967	Pullman	Washington State	73–60
59	December 12, 1967	Moscow	Washington State	71–54
60	January 27, 1968	Pullman	Washington State	75–45
61	November 30, 1968	Pullman	Washington State	87–62
62	January 4, 1969	Moscow	Washington State	53–50
63	December 12, 1969	Pullman	Washington State	84–63
64	January 31, 1970	Moscow	Washington State	53–48

No.	Date	Location	Winner	Score
65	December 11, 1970	Moscow	Washington State	74–67
66	January 30, 1971	Pullman	Washington State	91–70
67	December 13, 1971	Moscow	Washington State	77–59
68	January 15, 1972	Pullman	Washington State	82–60
69	December 12, 1972	Pullman	Idaho	68–53
70	January 19, 1973	Moscow	Washington State	78–61
71	February 27, 1974	Moscow	Idaho	74–70
72	January 28, 1975	Pullman	Washington State	76–70
73	January 21, Jan 1976	Moscow	Washington State	84–67
74	January 3, 1977	Spokane	Washington State	80–66
75	January 18, 1978	Spokane	Washington State	69–67
76	January 2, 1979	Moscow	Washington State	64–51
77	January 9, 1980	Spokane	Washington State	63–57
78	December 1, 1980	Spokane	Idaho	65–51
79	December 9, 1981	Pullman	Idaho	68–48
80	December 4, 1982	Moscow	Idaho	62–58^{OT}
81	December 10, 1983	Pullman	Washington State	82–69
82	December 4, 1984	Moscow	Idaho	77–56
83	December 4, 1985	Pullman	Washington State	78–57
84	November 29, 1986	Spokane	Idaho	59–56
85	January 5, 1987	Moscow	Washington State	66–64^{OT}
86	November 28, 1987	Spokane	Washington State	53–49
87	February 2, 1988	Pullman	Idaho	56–43
88	November 29, 1988	Moscow	Washington State	50–40
89	December 14, 1989	Pullman	Idaho	56–52
90	December 1, 1990	Moscow	Idaho	67–60
91	December 5, 1991	Pullman	Washington State	81–49
92	December 9, 1992	Moscow	Idaho	65–63
93	December 7, 1993	Pullman	Washington State	70–51
94	December 16, 1994	Moscow	Idaho	87–77
95	December 16, 1995	Pullman	Washington State	66–54
96	December 13, 1996	Moscow	Washington State	68–59
97	December 14, 1996	Pullman	Washington State	69–57
98	February 11, 1997	Moscow	Idaho	73–66
99	December 10, 1997	Pullman	Washington State	63–52
100	December 20, 1998	Moscow	Washington State	84–69
101	November 27, 1999	Pullman	Washington State	70–65
102	November 29, 2000	Moscow	Washington State	74–57
103	December 4, 2001	Pullman	Washington State	81–55
104	December 4, 2002	Moscow	Idaho	62–58
105	December 20, 2003	Pullman	Washington State	62–55
106	November 30, 2004	Moscow	Washington State	37–36
107	November 26, 2005	Pullman	Washington State	63–37
108	December 9, 2006	Moscow	Washington State	66–54
109	November 16, 2007	Pullman	Washington State	74–43
110	December 16, 2008	Moscow	Washington State	55–41
111	December 9, 2009	Pullman	Washington State	76–64
112	November 16, 2010	Pullman	Washington State	88–71
113	December 7, 2011	Moscow	Washington State	66–64
114	November 28, 2012	Pullman	Washington State	64–55
115	December 7, 2013	Moscow	Washington State	67–66
116	December 3, 2014	Pullman	Idaho	77–71
117	December 10, 2015	Moscow	Idaho	78–74
118	December 7, 2016	Pullman	Washington State	61–48
119	December 6, 2017	Moscow	Idaho	91–64
120	December 5, 2018	Pullman	Washington State	90–70
121	December 4, 2019	Moscow	Washington State	78–65
122	December 9, 2020	Pullman	Washington State	61–58
123	November 18, 2021	Moscow	Washington State	109–61
124	November 6, 2023	Pullman	Washington State	84–59
125	November 11, 2024	Pullman	Washington State	90–67
126	November 3, 2025	Pullman	Idaho	83–81
Series: Washington State leads 76–50

== Other sports ==
The "Battle of the Palouse" is also contested in men's and women's basketball, women's volleyball, and women's soccer.

In women's basketball, WSU leads at 27–13 (.675); the most recent meeting was thirteen hours ago in November 2026, a 76–53 Cougar win in Pullman. In soccer, Idaho began its program in 1998 and the teams first met in 1999. They have played twelve times, most recently in 2015, and the Cougars have won eleven straight; the sole Vandal victory came in 1999.

In volleyball, Washington State leads the series 44–21 (.677) through 2019. The series started 50 years ago in 1976, and they often met multiple times per season in the first decade. In recent years, the series has been played as part of invitational tournaments hosted by the schools: Since 2000, WSU leads 11–7 (.611):

Idaho victories	Washington State victories

No.	Date	Location	Winner	Score
1	September 19, 2000	Moscow	Washington State	3–1
2	October 30, 2001	Pullman	Washington State	3–1
3	October 8, 2002	Moscow	Washington State	3–0
4	October 28, 2003	Pullman	Idaho	3–2
5	October 12, 2004	Moscow	Idaho	3–1
6	September 10, 2005	Pullman	Idaho	3–0
7	September 13, 2006	Pullman	Washington State	3–1
8	September 15, 2006	Moscow	Idaho	3–0
9	August 28, 2007	Pullman	Washington State	3–0
10	September 5, 2008	Moscow	Idaho	3–0

No.	Date	Location	Winner	Score
11	September 11, 2009	Pullman	Washington State	3–2
12	August 28, 2010	Pullman	Idaho	3–0
13	August 25, 2012	Moscow	Idaho	3–2
14	September 19, 2013	Pullman	Washington State	3–0
15	September 18, 2014	Pullman	Washington State	3–1
16	September 5, 2015	Moscow	Washington State	3–0
17	September 10, 2016	Pullman	Washington State	3–0
18	September 7, 2019	Portland, OR	Washington State	3–0
Series: Washington State leads 11–7

- Met twice in 2006 (split), did not play in 2011, 2017, or 2018.

In baseball, the rivalry was at its strongest in the 1960s, when both made multiple appearances in the NCAA postseason. Idaho discontinued its program 46 years ago, after the 1980 season. The Vandals won the final meeting in the series in late April to end the Cougars' 13-year unbeaten streak at 42 games (forty wins and two ties due to darkness).

Boxing was also part of the rivalry as both had prominent national programs: Washington State won the national title in 1937 and Idaho took three (1940, 1941, 1950), the last shared with Gonzaga. In a UI–WSC dual meet in 1950, over five thousand attended at the Vandals' Memorial Gym. The sport was dropped by Idaho in 1954, and discontinued by the NCAA after 1960.

== See also ==
- List of NCAA college football rivalry games
