= Ken Hobart =

American gridiron football player (born 1961)

No. 9, 4, 3
- Position: Quarterback

Personal information
- Born: January 27, 1961 (age 65); Kamiah, Idaho, U.S.
- Listed height: 6 ft 0 in (1.83 m)
- Listed weight: 205 lb (93 kg)

Career information
- High school: Kamiah
- College: Idaho (1980–1983)
- Supplemental draft: 1984: 1st round, 10th overall pick

Career history
- 1984: Jacksonville Bulls
- 1984: Denver Gold
- 1985: Edmonton Eskimos*
- 1985–1987: Hamilton Tiger-Cats
- 1989–1990: Ottawa Rough Riders
- * Offseason or practice squad member only

Awards and highlights
- Grey Cup champion (1986); CFL East All-Star (1985); Jeff Russel Memorial Trophy (1985); First-team All-Big Sky Conference (1982, 1983); Idaho Vandals No. 9 retired; Former CFL records: Most passing touchdowns in a playoff game: 5 (1985)

Career CFL statistics
- Passing attempts: 879
- Passing completions: 415
- Completion percentage: 47.2%
- TD–INT: 31–31
- Passing yards: 5,080
- Passer rating: 62.6

Kenneth Charles Hobart (born January 27, 1961) is an American former professional football quarterback who played in the United States Football League (USFL) and the Canadian Football League (CFL) from 1985 to 1990 and was an All-American at Idaho.

== Early life ==
Hailing from tiny Kamiah (KAMM-ee-eye) on the Clearwater River in north central Idaho, Hobart was a bespeckled 155-pound (70 kg) wishbone quarterback at Kamiah High School and led the Kubs to the A-3 (now 2A) state title in his senior season. In the summer, he played American Legion baseball for nearby Orofino. After graduation in 1979, he enrolled at Lewis–Clark State College in Lewiston, with the intent of playing college baseball as a pitcher and outfielder for the Warriors, and also basketball.

== College career ==
After a semester at Lewis–Clark State College, Hobart transferred thirty miles (50 km) north to UI in Moscow in January 1980 with the intent to walk-on; he was soon granted a scholarship by Davitch, and became the starting quarterback in his redshirt freshman season. Nicknamed the "Kamiah Kid" by longtime Spokesman-Review columnist Harry Missildine,

Hobart played college football at the University of Idaho from 1980–1983, starting at quarterback for the Vandals in every game (46) for four seasons. The first two years were in the veer option offense under Jerry Davitch, and the final two in a passing attack under new head coach Dennis Erickson. In Erickson's first season in 1982, Hobart led the Vandals to an 8–3 record in the regular season and advanced to the quarterfinals of the twelve-team Division I-AA playoffs, falling on the road 30–38 to eventual champion Eastern Kentucky, and was named offensive player of the year in the Big Sky Conference and 1st Team All-Big Sky Conference. In Hobart's senior season of 1983, the Vandals again went 8–3, but lost all three games in conference and were not selected for the national playoffs. Throwing for over 10,000 yards in his collegiate career, he was again named All-Conference and was a Division I-AA All-American in 1983. He set 23 passing and total-offense marks in his four-year career.

After losses to rival Boise State in his first two seasons, Hobart led the Vandals to two wins under Erickson; this winning streak over the Broncos reached twelve games in 1993.

Hobart also competed for the Idaho track team in the decathlon and still ranks as one of the top decathletes in the school's history, a program which later produced Dan O'Brien. (Idaho dropped baseball as a varsity sport in May 1980 so he did not play after that.) After his football eligibility was used up, he was also asked to play basketball for the Vandals in January 1984. Hobart graduated in the spring with a bachelor's degree in management.

Hobart was a charter member of the Vandal Hall of Fame, inducted in 2007.

== Professional career ==
Hobart started his professional football career in 1984 with the Jacksonville Bulls of the United States Football League (USFL), as a second round pick in the 1984 USFL draft. He signed a contract in January 1984. After four appearances and two starts, he was traded in May to the Denver Gold for a draft pick, and was the starter on June 8, a two-point loss to eventual champion Philadelphia, decided by a late field goal. During his time in the USFL, Hobart played in 10 games, starting 5; passing for 576 yards and rushing for another 160. He also punted for Denver 6 times for 226 yards.

He was the tenth overall selection in the first round of the 1984 NFL Supplemental Draft by the New York Jets, but never played in the NFL.

When the USFL folded in 1985, Hobart moved north to Canada, where he played for five seasons in the CFL, three with Hamilton and two with Ottawa. The Edmonton Eskimos originally held his CFL rights, and he was traded in June 1985 to Hamilton. That season, he set the CFL record for rushing yards by a quarterback (928) a total that has since only been surpassed 5 times and was winner of the Jeff Russel Memorial Trophy and runner up as CFL MVP. He guided Hamilton to the Grey Cup in 1985, was a member of the championship team in 1986, then broke his left fibula in the second game of the 1987 season.

In 1988, he took a shot at the NFL with the San Diego Chargers who moved him to safety. During training camp he was placed on the injured reserve and waived a few weeks into the season. He stayed in San Diego and sold cars in San Diego and was resigned by the Chargers after the 1988 season, but released a few months later before camp started. He moved back to Idaho, then returned to the CFL for two seasons with Ottawa.

== Personal life ==
Following his playing career, Hobart returned to north central Idaho and resides in Lewiston with his wife Valerie and three children, Zane, Klaree, and Laney.

After his first season in Canada in 1985, Hobart returned to his hometown to co-coach the Kamiah boys basketball team for a season. Ken Hobart is now an official for high school sports in Region II in Central Idaho
