= 1981 NCAA Division I-AA Football Championship Game =

1981 NCAA Division I-AA Football Championship
- I-AA National Championship Game; Pioneer Bowl
Eastern Kentucky Colonels	Idaho State Bengals
(12–1)	(11–1)
Ohio Valley	Big Sky
23	34
Head coach: Roy Kidd	Head coach: Dave Kragthorpe
NCAA / Seed; 1 / 1	NCAA / Seed; 2 / 2
	1	2	3	4	Total
Eastern Kentucky	3	6	7	7	23
Idaho State	7	21	0	6	34
- Date: December 19, 1981
- Season: 1981
- Stadium: Memorial Stadium
- Location: Wichita Falls, Texas
- Attendance: 11,002

United States TV coverage
- Network: ABC Sports
- Announcers: Bill Flemming (play-by-play), Frank Broyles (color)

The 1981 NCAA Division I-AA Football Championship Game was a postseason college football game between the Eastern Kentucky Colonels and the Idaho State Bengals. The game was played on December 19, 1981, at Memorial Stadium in Wichita Falls, Texas. The culminating game of the 1981 NCAA Division I-AA football season, it was won by Idaho State, 34–23.

The game was also known as the Pioneer Bowl, a name that had been used starting in 1971 for various NCAA playoff games held in Wichita Falls. The Colonels were making their third consecutive appearance in the I-AA championship game.

== Teams ==
The participants of the Championship Game were the finalists of the 1981 I-AA Playoffs, which began with an eight-team bracket.

=== Eastern Kentucky Colonels ===
Eastern Kentucky finished their regular season with a 10–1 record (8–0 in conference); their only loss was to Navy of Division I-A. Ranked first in the final NCAA I-AA in-house poll and seeded first in the tournament, the Colonels defeated seventh-seed Delaware and fourth-seed Boise State to reach the final. This was the third appearance for Eastern Kentucky in a Division I-AA championship game, having won in 1979 and having lost in 1980.

=== Idaho State Bengals ===
Idaho State finished their regular season with a 9–1 record (6–1 in conference); their only loss was an away game at Montana. Ranked second in the final NCAA I-AA in-house poll and seeded second in the tournament, the Bengals defeated eighth-seed Rhode Island and third-seed South Carolina State to reach the final. This was the first appearance for Idaho State in a Division I-AA championship game.

== Game summary ==
=== Scoring summary ===
Scoring summary

Quarter	Time	Drive			Team	Scoring information	Score	
Quarter	Time	Plays	Yards	TOP	Team	Scoring information	EKU	ISU
1					EKU	21-yard field goal by Jamie Lovett	3	0
1	3:07		80		ISU	Chris Corp 17-yard touchdown reception from Mike Machurek, Case deBruijn kick good	3	7
2					EKU	Ed Hairston 3-yard touchdown run, Lovett kick failed	9	7
2		6	52		ISU	Dwain Wilson 6-yard touchdown run, deBruijn kick good	9	14
2			80		ISU	Chris Ewing 9-yard touchdown reception from Machurek, deBruijn kick good	9	21
2	2:52		38		ISU	Wilson 6-yard touchdown run, deBruijn kick good	9	28
3	5:17		71		EKU	Nicky Yeast 2-yard touchdown run, Lovett kick good	16	28
4	14:__		74		ISU	Paul Fite 2-yard touchdown run, 2-point run failed	16	34
4	8:13				EKU	Yeast 4-yard touchdown run, Lovett kick good	23	34
"TOP" = time of possession. For other American football terms, see Glossary of American football.							23	34

=== Game statistics ===
	1	2	3	4	Total
Colonels	3	6	7	7	23
Bengals	7	21	0	6	34

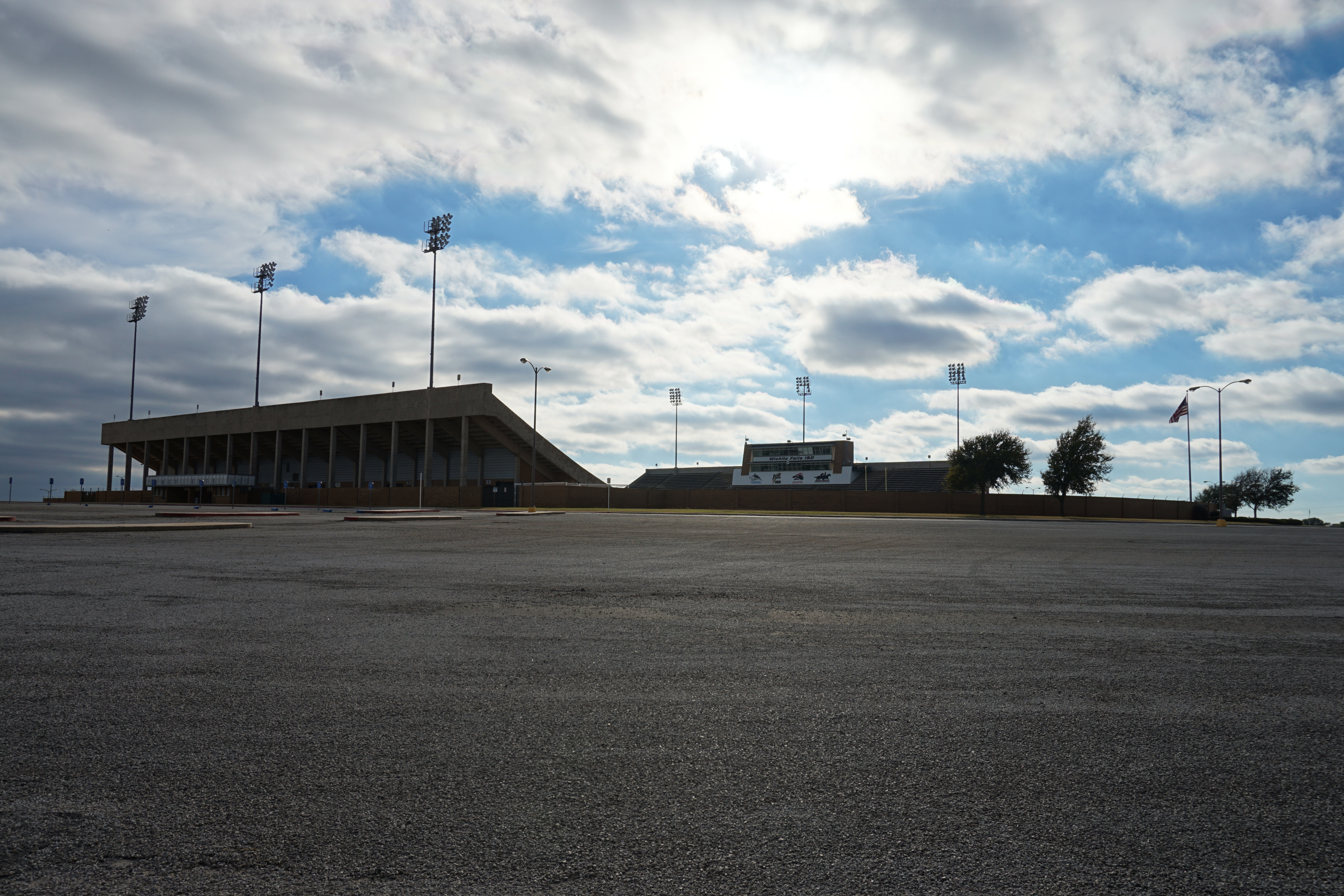
Memorial Stadium, site of the 1981 I-AA title game

Statistics	EKU	ISU
First downs	19	24
Plays–yards	75–386	77–482
Rushes–yards	47–167	31–102
Passing yards	219	380
Passing: comp–att–int	14–28–1	31–46–0
Time of possession		

Team	Category	Player	Statistics
Eastern Kentucky	Passing	Chris Isaac	14–28, 219 yds, 1 INT
Eastern Kentucky	Rushing	Nicky Yeast	10 car, 58 yds
Eastern Kentucky	Receiving	Steve Bird	5 rec, 81 yds
Idaho State	Passing	Mike Machurek	29–44, 380 yds, 2 TD
Idaho State	Rushing	Dwain Wilson	12 car, 58 yds, 2 TD
Idaho State	Receiving	Jerry Bird	9 rec, 139 yds

== See also ==
- 1981 NCAA Division I-AA football rankings
