= Case deBruijn =

Dutch gridiron football player (born 1960)

No. 5, 3, 75, 65
- Positions: Punter, placekicker

Personal information
- Born: April 11, 1960 (age 66); The Hague, Netherlands
- Listed height: 6 ft 0 in (1.83 m)
- Listed weight: 176 lb (80 kg)

Career information
- High school: Stonewall Jackson (VA)
- College: Idaho State
- NFL draft: 1982: 8th round, 214th overall pick

Career history
- Kansas City Chiefs (1982); Atlanta Falcons (1983)*; New Orleans Saints (1983)*; Oklahoma/Arizona Outlaws (1984–1985)
- * Offseason or practice squad member only

Career NFL statistics
- Games played: 1
- Punts: 5
- Punting yards: 174
- Punting average: 34.8
- Longest punt: 56
- Stats at Pro Football Reference

Case deBruijn (born April 11, 1960) is a Dutch former player of American football who was a punter and placekicker. He played one game in the National Football League (NFL) for the Kansas City Chiefs as well as two seasons in the United States Football League (USFL) for the Oklahoma/Arizona Outlaws. He played college football for the Idaho State Bengals and was selected in the eighth round of the 1982 NFL draft by the Chiefs.

== Early life and education ==
Case deBruijn was born on April 11, 1960, in The Hague, Netherlands. He was taught by his father, a well-known amateur soccer player, how to kick a soccer ball as a toddler. When young, his family moved to America, settling in a suburban community in Washington. He attended Stonewall Jackson High School in Virginia, where he played running back as well as placekicker and punter, earning all-county or all-district honors in three consecutive seasons.

DeBruijn's high school coach, impressed by his kicking, sent several letters to college coaches about deBruijn after the latter graduated from the school. One letter reached Tom Jewell, an assistant football coach at Idaho State University, who gave deBruijn a tryout. He performed well enough in his tryout to be invited to stay as a walk-on. By the middle of his freshman year, 1978, he was doing well enough to start at both punter and placekicker. DeBruijn ended up earning first-team all-conference honors that year, the first of three times he would be given that honor. He was the 1978 national runner-up in average yards per-punt.

DeBruijn again was runner-up in punting average as a sophomore, but the 1979 Idaho State Bengals football team compiled a 0–11 record and deBruijn missed the all-conference team for the only time in his collegiate career. As a junior, deBruijn led the United States with a 48 yards-per-punt average and was named first-team all-conference at both punter and kicker. An honorable mention All-American, deBruijn began receiving attention from pro scouts at this time.

As a senior in 1981, deBruijn helped the Bengals compile a 12–1 record and capture the Division I-AA national championship, leading the nation in punting with a 45.9 average, the third highest in FCS/I-AA history, and earning first-team All-America honors as well as first-team all-conference honors. He was ranked the number two punter/placekicker entering the 1982 NFL draft only behind Rohn Stark from Florida State. "It seemed that all kinds of people were interested in me," deBruijn said. "Teams were sending scouts out to watch me and [quarterback Mike] Machurek and asking for film. By the time of the draft, I knew I would be the second punter picked – and I was pretty sure it would be Kansas City that picked me." He finished his college career as the all-time conference leader in punts (with 256), punting yards (with 11,184), and highest average per-punt (43.7).

== Professional career ==
The Kansas City Chiefs ended up selecting deBruijn with the 214th overall pick in the eighth round of the 1982 NFL Draft. He officially signed his rookie contract, a one-year deal, on July 1. In training camp, deBruijn, a three-step kicker, was able to make several 60-yard kicks, after which he was taken aside by the coaching staff. "They told me my leg looked good, but that they wanted a two-step kicker," he said. "In the NFL, the emphasis is on doing anything to keep from getting a kick blocked. I just couldn't hack it." He was released at the final roster cuts on August 31, losing the position battle to Jeff Gossett.

DeBruijn was one of three punters who attended a Houston Oilers tryout on December 2. He was not signed, with John James receiving the Oilers' punting job. DeBruijn was re-signed by the Chiefs in mid-December, four days before their game against the Denver Broncos, after the team released Gossett. "They brought me in four days before the game and said, 'OK, you're our punter.' I was nervous, but I felt all right," he said. In the game, played on December 19, deBruijn attempted five punts, going for just 174 yards, a 34.8 average. One of his kicks was returned by Rick Upchurch for a touchdown. His longest punt went for 56 yards. His play was considered such a "disaster" that, shortly after the match, Kansas City released deBruijn and re-signed Gossett.

DeBruijn went through six months of sporadic tryouts until in March 1983, after a successful tryout with the Atlanta Falcons, he was given another NFL contract. He was confident in camp, saying "I felt that I was going to have a chance. I kicked all right, they cut some other punters and I was feeling pretty confident until they called me in an told me I was being cut. I couldn't believe it." His release was made on August 1. Afterwards, he was signed by the New Orleans Saints, only to be released on August 29 during roster cuts.

After being released by the Saints, deBruijn moved to back to Virginia with his wife, intending to give the NFL one more shot in 1984. "My life was just in limbo," he said. "I couldn't go get a job, because I couldn't tell an employer on a few hours' notice, 'sorry, I won't be here tomorrow and the next day because I've got a tryout with the Patriots.' So I moved back home and went to work for my dad. I decided that if I didn't make it in 1984, I'd forget about football."

In February 1984, deBruijn received a surprise call from the Oklahoma Outlaws of the United States Football League (USFL), who gave him a contract. "They brought me in with a few other guys, like they did in the NFL, only after a while I found that I was the [only] one left. They told me the job was mine and they just let me go out and kick." He was the team's punter for most of the season, appearing in 16 out of 18 games and punting 75 times for 3,028 yards, an average of 40.4 per-kick. DeBruijn recorded 21 punts inside the 20 and had nine touchbacks, with a long punt of 66 yards.

DeBruijn continued as Outlaws' punter for the 1985 season, as the team moved to Arizona and was renamed to the Arizona Outlaws. He was the only player to punt for the team that year, appearing in all 18 games. He punted a total of 65 times during the season, with his kicks going for 2,765 yards, an average of 42.5 yards per-kick. He had a long punt of 79 yards and kicked 22 inside the 20 as well as eight touchbacks. He also made one rush which gained eight yards. DeBruijn signed a new contract with Arizona in August 1985; however, the league folded before the 1986 season was to begin, ending his professional football career.

== Later life ==
After his football career, deBruijn moved to Elko, Nevada, and became an employee of the mining company Newmont. He also was a volunteer kicking coach for Elko High School.

DeBruijn was on the College Football Hall of Fame ballot in 2014 and again in 2022.
