= 1981 Idaho Vandals football team =

American college football season

1981 Idaho Vandals football
- Conference: Big Sky Conference
- Record: 3–8 (0–7 Big Sky)
- Head coach: Jerry Davitch (4th season)
- Offensive coordinator: Bill Tripp (4th season)
- Offensive scheme: Veer
- Defensive coordinator: Leland Kendall (2nd season)
- Home stadium: Idaho Stadium

1981 Big Sky Conference football standings
| | Conf. | | | | | Overall |
| Team | W | | L | | T | W | | L | | T |
|---|---|---|---|---|---|---|---|---|---|---|
| No. 2 Idaho State $^ | 6 | – | 1 | – | 0 | 12 | – | 1 | – | 0 |
| No. 5 Boise State ^ | 6 | – | 1 | – | 0 | 10 | – | 3 | – | 0 |
| Montana | 5 | – | 2 | – | 0 | 7 | – | 3 | – | 0 |
| Nevada | 4 | – | 3 | – | 0 | 7 | – | 4 | – | 0 |
| Weber State | 4 | – | 3 | – | 0 | 7 | – | 4 | – | 0 |
| Northern Arizona | 2 | – | 5 | – | 0 | 4 | – | 7 | – | 0 |
| Montana State | 1 | – | 6 | – | 0 | 3 | – | 7 | – | 0 |
| Idaho | 0 | – | 7 | – | 0 | 3 | – | 8 | – | 0 |
$ – Conference champion; ^ – NCAA Division I-AA playoff participant; Rankings from NCAA Division I-AA Committee poll

The 1981 Idaho Vandals football team represented the University of Idaho in the 1981 NCAA Division I-AA football season. The Vandals, led by fourth-year head coach Jerry Davitch, were members of the Big Sky Conference and played their home games at the Kibbie Dome, an indoor facility on campus in Moscow, Idaho.

Led by sophomore quarterback Ken Hobart in the veer offense, the Vandals finished 3–8 in the regular season but were winless in the Big Sky. In the season finale, Idaho lost to rival Boise State for the fifth straight year, but it was the Broncos' last win over Idaho until 1994, as the Vandals won a dozen straight in the interim. In their third and final win in early October, running back Russell Davis set a school record with 345 rushing yards at Portland State.

In August, Sports Illustrated had picked the Vandals as one of the top teams in Division I-AA, with high expectations to improve on the previous year's 6–5 record. But after a fifth straight loss and no wins in six conference games, Davitch was fired nine days before the final game against Boise State. Several weeks later Dennis Erickson was hired and immediately turned the Vandal program around in 1982, reaching the quarterfinals of the 12-team Division I-AA playoffs.

In 1981, Idaho State and Boise State were the top two teams in the Big Sky and both advanced to the 8-team Division I-AA playoffs, won their first-round games, and hosted the semifinals. Boise State was stopped by Eastern Kentucky, whom Idaho State defeated the following week in Texas to win the national title.

== Notable players ==
Sophomore quarterback Ken Hobart of Kamiah changed from an option quarterback in the veer to a prolific passer under Erickson. He led the Vandals to a 9–4 record in 1982 and an 8–3 record in 1983 as a senior, when he was a Division I-AA All-American. Hobart played a season in the USFL with Jacksonville in 1984 and several in the CFL.

Junior linebacker Sam Merriman from Tucson was selected in the seventh round (177th overall) of the 1983 NFL draft by the Seattle Seahawks. A four-year starter for the Vandals, he played five seasons with Seattle, primarily on special teams. A serious knee injury in a 1988 preseason game ended his playing career.

== Fallen teammate ==
At the close of the 1981 spring semester, Vandal wide receiver Joe Keogh, age 20, was killed in a mid-morning automobile accident. En route to Seattle on Saturday, May 16, he was one of four occupants in a vehicle westbound on Interstate 90, west of Ellensburg. The driver, a family friend, lost control and veered off the road and the car ended on its side. Keogh, a 1979 graduate of Gonzaga Prep in Spokane, was the only fatality.

Keogh's Vandal teammates wore his number 4 on the right side of their helmets during the 1981 season. It was the second death for the football team in less than ten months: prior to his senior season, standout running back Glen White had died in August 1980 after a brief battle with aplastic anemia.

== Schedule ==
| Date | Time | Opponent | Site | Result | Attendance | Source |
|---|---|---|---|---|---|---|
| September 5 | 7:30 p.m. | Simon Fraser* | Kibbie Dome; Moscow, ID | W 52–7 | 10,500 | |
| September 12 | 6:30 p.m. | at Weber State | Wildcat Stadium; Ogden, UT | L 21–42 | 15,900 | |
| September 19 | 7:30 p.m. | Northern Iowa* | Kibbie Dome; Moscow, ID | W 59–14 | 12,000 | |
| September 26 | 10:30 p.m. | at Hawaii* | Aloha Stadium; Halawa, HI | L 6–21 | 43,719 | |
| October 3 | 7:00 p.m. | at Portland State* | Civic Stadium; Portland, OR | W 56–9 | 3,727 | |
| October 10 | 7:30 p.m. | Montana | Kibbie Dome; Moscow, ID (Little Brown Stein) | L 14–16 | 11,000 | |
| October 17 | 1:00 p.m. | at Montana State | Reno H. Sales Stadium; Bozeman, MT | L 28–29 | 10,017 | |
| October 24 | 1:30 p.m. | Nevada^{†} | Kibbie Dome; Moscow, ID | L 14–23 | 14,000 | |
| October 31 | 7:30 p.m. | No. 3 Idaho State | Kibbie Dome; Moscow, ID | L 14–24 | 10,500 | |
| November 7 | 6:30 p.m. | at Northern Arizona | Walkup Skydome; Flagstaff, AZ | L 3–24 | 10,500 | |
| November 21 | 7:30 p.m. | No. 4 Boise State | Kibbie Dome; Moscow, ID (rivalry) | L 43–45 | 14,000 | |
*Non-conference game; ^{†}Homecoming; Rankings from NCAA Division I-AA Football Committee Poll released prior to the game; All times are in Pacific time

== Roster ==
1981 Idaho Vandals football team roster
Players
Coaches
Offense

| Pos. | # | Name | Class |
|---|---|---|---|
| RB | 3 | Russell Davis | Sr |
| FL | 7 | Jack Klein | Sr |
| QB | 9 | Ken Hobart | So |
| QB | 11 | Mark Vigil | So |
| QB | 16 | Carmen Espinoza |
| QB, RB | 30 | Dave Jeranko | Sr |
| RB | 34 | Randy Zimmerman |
| RB | 35 | Wally Jones | Jr |
| RB | 33 | Terry Idler | Jr |
| RB | 45 | Tim Payne | Jr |
| LG | 56 | Kima Sua | Jr |
| RG | 62 | Steve Seman | Jr |
| LT | 63 | Dave Frohnen | Jr |
| C | 64 | Bob Wartella | Jr |
| LG | 72 | Tony Cotta | Sr |
| RT | 74 | Bruce Fery | Sr |
| LT | 76 | Greg Diehl | Jr |
| TE | 80 | Tom Coombs | Sr |
| TE | 87 | Kurt Vestman | So |
| WR | 88 | Vic Wallace | Jr |
| WR | | Curtis Johnson | Jr |

Defense

| Pos. | # | Name | Class |
|---|---|---|---|
| CB | 2 | Calvin Loveall | Fr |
| CB | 22 | Mike Keough | Sr |
| SS | 25 | Kelly Miller | Sr |
| CB | 41 | Greg Jennings | Sr |
| FS | 42 | Boyce Bailey | So |
| CB | 43 | Howard Wilcox | Jr |
| DE | 44 | Frank Moreno | So |
| NG | 47 | Darby Lewis | So |
| LB | 52 | Sam Merriman | Jr |
| LB | 57 | Larry White | So |
| NG | 79 | Paul Griffin | Jr |
| DT | 83 | Dan Saso | Sr |
| DE | 84 | Jay Hayes | Sr |
| DT | 85 | John Fortner | Jr |
| DE | 90 | Lloyd Williamson | So |

Special teams

| Pos. | # | Name | Class |
|---|---|---|---|
| KR | 2 | Calvin Loveall | Fr |
| PK, P | 6 | Pete O'Brien | Sr |

Head coach

- Jerry Davitch (4th year)

Coordinators/assistant coaches

- Bill Tripp (OC)
- Leland Kendall (DC)

Legend

- (C) Team captain
- (S) Suspended
- (I) Ineligible
- Injured
- Redshirt

== All-conference ==
No Vandals made the first team; second team selections included quarterback Ken Hobart, wide receiver Jack Klein, and linebackers Sam Merriman and Jay Hayes. Honorable mention were tackle Bruce Fery, guard Steve Seman, defensive linemen John Fortner and Dan Saso, and safety Kelly Miller. Despite leading the conference with over 111 yards rushing per game, running back Russell Davis was overlooked.

== NFL draft ==
Two Vandal seniors were selected in the 1982 NFL draft, which lasted twelve rounds (334 selections).

| Player | Position | Round | Overall | Franchise |
| Tom Coombs | TE | 7th | 181 | New York Jets |
| Russell Davis | RB | 11th | 305 | Cincinnati Bengals |
