= 1981 Northern Arizona Lumberjacks football team =

American college football season

1981 Northern Arizona Lumberjacks football
- Conference: Big Sky Conference
- Record: 4–7 (2–5 Big Sky)
- Head coach: Dwain Painter (3rd season)
- Home stadium: Walkup Skydome

1981 Big Sky Conference football standings
	Conf.					Overall
Team	W		L		T	W		L		T
No. 2 Idaho State $^	6	–	1	–	0	12	–	1	–	0
No. 5 Boise State ^	6	–	1	–	0	10	–	3	–	0
Montana	5	–	2	–	0	7	–	3	–	0
Nevada	4	–	3	–	0	7	–	4	–	0
Weber State	4	–	3	–	0	7	–	4	–	0
Northern Arizona	2	–	5	–	0	4	–	7	–	0
Montana State	1	–	6	–	0	3	–	7	–	0
Idaho	0	–	7	–	0	3	–	8	–	0
$ – Conference champion; ^ – NCAA Division I-AA playoff participant; Rankings from NCAA Division I-AA Committee poll

The 1981 Northern Arizona Lumberjacks football team represented Northern Arizona University as a member of the Big Sky Conference during the 1981 NCAA Division I-AA football season. Led by third-year head coach Bud Hake, the Lumberjacks compiled an overall record of 4–7, with a mark of 2–5 in conference play, and finished sixth in the Big Sky.

== Schedule ==
Date	Opponent	Site	Result	Attendance	Source
September 5	at Texas A&I*	Javelina Stadium; Kingsville, TX	L 3–26		
September 12	North Dakota State*	Walkup Skydome; Flagstaff, AZ	W 23–17	11,750	
September 19	Montana	Walkup Skydome; Flagstaff, AZ	L 23–29	11,500	
September 26	at No. 10 Boise State	Bronco Stadium; Boise, ID	L 20–34	17,622	
October 3	at No. 3 Idaho State	ASISU Minidome; Pocatello, ID	L 6–31	11,284	
October 10	Nevada	Walkup Skydome; Flagstaff, AZ	L 17–34	13,000	
October 17	at Portland State*	Civic Stadium; Portland, OR	W 34–10	3,165	
October 24	Montana State	Walkup Skydome; Flagstaff, AZ	W 20–14		
October 31	at Weber State	Wildcat Stadium; Ogden, UT	L 23–24 ^{OT}		
November 7	Idaho	Walkup Skydome; Flagstaff, AZ	W 24–3	10,500	
November 14	vs. Cal Poly Pomona*	Sun Devil Stadium; Tempe, AZ	L 33–35	4,214	
*Non-conference game; Rankings from NCAA Division I-AA Football Committee Poll released prior to the game
