= Jerry Davitch =

American football player and coach (born 1941)

Biographical details
- Born: June 9, 1941 (age 85); Johnstown, Pennsylvania, U.S.

Playing career
- 1962–1965: Arizona
- Position: Guard

Coaching career (HC unless noted)
- 1969–1972: Salpointe Catholic HS (AZ)
- 1973–1975: Air Force (OL)
- 1976–1977: Air Force (WR)
- 1978–1981: Idaho
- 1985–1990: Greater Johnstown HS (PA)
- 1996–2004: Conemaugh Township HS (PA)
- 2000: Johnstown Jackals
- 2014–2015: Bishop McCort HS (PA)

Head coaching record
- Overall: 15–29 (college)

Jerry J. Davitch (born June 9, 1941) is a former college football coach and secondary school administrator. Since 2004, he has served as the superintendent of schools in Richland Township, just northeast of Johnstown, Pennsylvania. Davitch served in a similar capacity for eight years (1996–2004) in nearby Conemaugh Township in Davidsville. He was previously the principal of Conemaugh Township High School and its head football coach.

== Playing career ==
The son of immigrant parents, Davitch played on the offensive line at Greater Johnstown High School in Johnstown, Pennsylvania. He was an undersized right guard (5 ft 10 in (1.78 m), 168 lb (76 kg)) for the Trojans on an undefeated championship team in the fall of 1958. After graduation in 1959, he accepted a scholarship and headed west to play college football and wrestle at the University of Arizona in Tucson. Davitch started two years at guard for the Wildcats and was the captain of the wrestling team as a senior; he earned a bachelor's degree in education from UA in 1965.

== Early coaching career ==
After starting as an assistant coach, Davitch first became a head coach in 1969 at Salpointe High School in Tucson. His record was 28–12 (.700) in the four years, including a 9–1 season in 1971. While at Salpointe, he completed his master's degree in secondary education at UA in 1971. His offense at Salpointe used the relatively new wishbone formation.

Davitch moved up to college ranks after the 1972 season as an assistant coach at Air Force for five seasons, from 1973 through 1977. Under head coach Ben Martin, Davitch coached the offensive line for the first three seasons and receivers for the final two.

== Collegiate head coach ==
On January 10, 1978, 36-year-oid Davitch was hired as the head coach of the Idaho Vandals of the Big Sky Conference, at an annual salary of $26,000.

At the time, Idaho football had posted just four winning seasons in over four decades, and the last four head coaches had been fired after two to four seasons. In addition, no Vandal head football coach had left with a winning record since 1928. Through the 1977 season, Idaho was a Division I football program in a Division II football conference. When the Big Sky was formed in 1963, Idaho intended to join for all sports except football, and continued to play as a "University Division" independent, which it did through 1964 with Dee Andros. At the time, there were six teams in the conference and one did not play football (Gonzaga), for only four conference games per year. Idaho had been a member of the Pacific Coast Conference (PCC) from 1922 through 1958, the conference's final football season.

Idaho reluctantly agreed to conference play in the Big Sky for the 1965 season, but maintained the upper tier status by filling their non-conference schedule with other University Division teams. After a weak schedule in 1966, when "Thunder Ray" McDonald led the nation in rushing, the program was temporarily downgraded by the NCAA in August 1967, but was elevated back to the University Division in July 1969, renamed "Division I" prior to the 1973 season. The Big Sky added two teams in 1970, and it became increasingly difficult for the Vandals to stay healthy through its competitive non-conference games, then often fared poorly with reserves when conference play resumed. With the formation of Division I-AA in 1978, both Idaho and the Big Sky were moved to the new division for its first year, also Davitch's.

Davitch replaced the popular Ed Troxel, a longtime defensive assistant, four-year head coach, and former head coach of the track team. Troxel was asked to resign by the new university president on New Year's Eve, six weeks after his fourth season concluded with a disappointing 3–8 record. The Vandals were 7–4 the previous season (1976), their first winning record in five years. (Troxel, the highly successful head coach at Borah High in Boise for its first nine years (1958–66), had been reluctant to accept the position; he turned it down after the 1970 and 1973 seasons, but was ultimately persuaded by the players to accept.)

Davitch retained the veer option on offense, but the progress was slow in his first two seasons. In his third season in 1980, the improving Vandals went 6–5 with walk-on redshirt freshman Ken Hobart at quarterback, with a 4–3 record in conference play. Expectations were high entering the 1981 season, and the "Gold Rush" Vandals were picked as one of the top five teams in Division I-AA by Sports Illustrated. The Vandals lost close games and then were hit by injuries; they lost their final six games to finish at 3–8 and were winless in conference. (Mercurial Idaho State won the Big Sky and the Division I-AA title in 1981.)

Davitch compiled a 15–29 (.341) record in his four seasons in Moscow and became the fifth consecutive head coach to fired; he was notified nine days before his final game, a 43–45 home loss to rival Boise State, the defending I-AA national champions. Davitch was succeeded by 34-year-old Dennis Erickson, hired on December 11. Idaho achieved success in the next two decades and did not fire a head football coach for 22 years (Tom Cable after 2003).

== After Idaho ==
In 1982, Davitch returned to Tucson to work as an athletics administrator for the public school district and as a broadcaster for Arizona football. While at Idaho in 1980, Davitch had interviewed for the Arizona head coaching position, which went to Larry Smith, then at Tulane.

After several years in Arizona, Davitch returned to Pennsylvania and was the head coach at his alma mater, Greater Johnstown High School, from 1985 to 1990. In six seasons, he had a 37–23–3 (.611) record, which included a title in 1989. Davitch was later the head coach at Conemaugh Township High School in Davidsville. Davitch was also the principal of CT High School, and later the superintendent of schools (1996–2004). In 2004, he became superintendent of schools in Richland Township, just northeast of his childhood hometown of Johnstown.

At age 73, Davitch came out of retirement in 2014 to be the head football coach at Bishop McCort High School in Johnstown.

== Personal ==
While head coach at Idaho, Davitch married his wife Terry and both of their sons were born, Jim and Jerry. Both served as officers in the U.S. Air Force, as did their wives.

== Head coaching record ==
=== College ===
Year	Team	Overall	Conference	Standing	Bowl/playoffs
Idaho Vandals (Big Sky Conference) (1978–1981)
1978	Idaho	2–9	2–4	6th	
1979	Idaho	4–7	2–5	6th	
1980	Idaho	6–5	4–3	4th	
1981	Idaho	3–8	0–7	8th	
Idaho:		15–29	8–19		
Total:		15–29			
