= Rick Woods (American football) =

American football player (born 1959)

No. 22, 20
- Positions: Safety, cornerback

Personal information
- Born: November 16, 1959 (age 66); Boise, Idaho, U.S.
- Listed height: 6 ft 0 in (1.83 m)
- Listed weight: 196 lb (89 kg)

Career information
- High school: Boise
- College: Boise State
- NFL draft: 1982: 4th round, 97th overall pick

Career history
- Pittsburgh Steelers (1982–1986); Tampa Bay Buccaneers (1987)

Awards and highlights
- NCAA Division I-AA national champion (1980)

Career NFL statistics
- Interceptions: 13
- Fumble recoveries: 6
- Touchdowns: 1
- Stats at Pro Football Reference

Rick L. Woods (born November 16, 1959) is an American former professional football player, a defensive back in the National Football League (NFL). He played safety and cornerback for six seasons for the Pittsburgh Steelers from 1982 to 1987 and the Tampa Bay Buccaneers in 1987.

Woods was born in Boise, Idaho, on November 16, 1959. He played football at Boise High School. He played college football at Boise State, where he was a standout defensive back and punt returner. He was a member of the I-AA national championship team in 1980, and the 1981 team that reached the national semifinals. As a punt returner at BSU, he rarely called a fair catch, earning him the nickname "Riverboat Gambler." In the 1982 NFL draft in late April, Woods was selected in the fourth round (97th overall) by the Steelers.
