= 1981 Weber State Wildcats football team =

American college football season

1981 Weber State Wildcats football
- Conference: Big Sky Conference
- Record: 7–4 (4–3 Big Sky)
- Head coach: Mike Price (1st season)
- Defensive coordinator: Dave Campo (1st season)
- Home stadium: Wildcat Stadium

1981 Big Sky Conference football standings
	Conf.					Overall
Team	W		L		T	W		L		T
No. 2 Idaho State $^	6	–	1	–	0	12	–	1	–	0
No. 5 Boise State ^	6	–	1	–	0	10	–	3	–	0
Montana	5	–	2	–	0	7	–	3	–	0
Nevada	4	–	3	–	0	7	–	4	–	0
Weber State	4	–	3	–	0	7	–	4	–	0
Northern Arizona	2	–	5	–	0	4	–	7	–	0
Montana State	1	–	6	–	0	3	–	7	–	0
Idaho	0	–	7	–	0	3	–	8	–	0
$ – Conference champion; ^ – NCAA Division I-AA playoff participant; Rankings from NCAA Division I-AA Committee poll

The 1981 Weber State Wildcats football team represented Weber State College—now known as Weber State University—as a member of the Big Sky Conference during the 1981 NCAA Division I-AA football season. Led by first-year head coach Mike Price, the Wildcats compiled an overall record of 7–4 with a mark of 4–3 in conference play, tying for fourth place in the Big Sky. Weber State played home games at Wildcat Stadium in Ogden, Utah.

== Schedule ==
Date	Time	Opponent	Site	Result	Attendance	Source
September 12	7:30 p.m.	Idaho	Wildcat Stadium; Ogden, UT	W 42–21	15,900	
September 19		at Utah State*	Romney Stadium; Logan, UT	L 18–31	17,132	
September 26		Portland State	Wildcat Stadium; Ogden, UT	W 31–16	16,841	
October 3		at No. 7 Montana State	Reno H. Sales Stadium; Bozeman, MT	W 28–20		
October 10		Puget Sound*	Wildcat Stadium; Ogden, UT	W 31–10	7,841	
October 17		at Nevada	Mackay Stadium; Reno, NV	L 14–28	10,254	
October 24	1:30 p.m.	No. 4 Boise State^{†}	Wildcat Stadium; Ogden, UT	L 19–33	12,306	
October 31		Northern Arizona	Wildcat Stadium; Ogden, UT	W 24–23 ^{OT}		
November 7		Augustana (SD)*	Wildcat Stadium; Ogden, UT	W 27–7		
November 14		at No. 9 Montana	Dornblaser Field; Missoula, MT	W 7–6	9,000	
November 21		at No. 2 Idaho State	ASISU Minidome; Pocatello, ID	L 30–33 ^{3OT}	13,444	
*Non-conference game; ^{†}Homecoming; Rankings from NCAA Division I-AA Football Committee Poll released prior to the game; All times are in Mountain time

== Roster ==
1981 Weber State Wildcats football team roster
Players
Coaches
Offense

Pos.	#	Name	Class
RB	2	Mark Caskey	Jr
WR	4	Todd Boyer	Fr
QB	6	Rob Hause	Fr
QB	7	Milt Myers	So
QB	8	Tim Bernal	So
QB	9	Emanuel Crockett	Fr
WR	10	Gerald Bradley	Jr
RB	11	Scott Roth	Jr
WR	13	Steve Baggs	So
QB	16	Richard McKee	Sr
QB	17	Jeff Roeszler	Jr
RB	23	Kevin Matthews	Jr
RB	26	Rodney Brewer	Jr
RB	27	Freddie Cook	Fr
WR	28	Chris Kelly	Jr
RB	31	Dale Anderson	Fr
RB	34	Phil Swan	So
RB	35	Phil Varsek	Fr
WR	41	Eric Allen	Sr
WR	44	Terry Magee	Jr
WR	47	Ray McNeil	So
C	51	Greg Baptist	Fr
C	52	Greg Weigel	Jr
C	54	Bret Frodsham	Jr
C	59	Tom Brothers	Jr
C	60	Mike Stephens	So
G	61	Mark Masters	Jr
G	65	Lawrence Livingston	Jr
G	66	Dave Dansie	Sr
G	67	Jim Bobinsky	So
G	70	Mike Montgomery	Jr
OT	74	Greg Bolinger	So
OT	75	Sam Slater	So
G	76	Franklin John	Fr
OT	78	Bret Smith	Sr
OT	79	John Mitchell	Jr
TE	81	Steve Baty	So
WR, P	82	Curt Miller	Sr
TE	86	Scott Zellmer	Jr
TE	87	Phil Principe	So
TE	89	Norm Haney	Fr

Defense

Pos.	#	Name	Class
CB	1	John Fitzgerald	Fr
CB	3	Sammi Reeves	Jr
FS	5	Victor Fletcher	Jr
LB	12	Greg Davis	Sr
FS	14	Tim Hill	Sr
CB	15	Steve Alford	Fr
SS	24	Kris Jugler	Jr
CB	25	Darryl Harris	So
LB	33	Joe Jeppson	Fr
LB	36	Danny Rich	Sr
LB	37	Ray Williams	Jr
LB	38	Jeff Moore	Sr
LB	39	John Geyerman	Fr
LB	40	Baron Harrell	Jr
SS	42	Jim Arslanian	Jr
CB	43	Brian Schaffer	So
CB	45	Elbert Gray	Sr
LB	46	Kevin Kaczmarzewski	So
LB	48	Garth Fjellstrom	Fr
CB	49	Alfred Stone	Fr
DT	50	Curtis McGhan	Sr
LB	53	Kevin Flye	Jr
NG	55	John Kavanaugh	Jr
LB	56	Bob Casper	Jr
LB	57	Mike Nichter	Jr
LB	58	John Fullington	Sr
DT	62	Terrence Phillips	Jr
NG	63	Manase Tuatagaloa	Jr
LB	68	Shawn Moore	Fr
NG	69	Tim Cox	Fr
NG	71	Mike Morley	Sr
DT	77	Danny Stuber	Sr
DT	80	Bret Rahn	Jr
DT	88	Dave Goff	So

Special teams

Pos.	#	Name	Class
K	19	Roger Ruzek	Jr
K	29	Bill Cullen	Fr
K	40	Dave Griffin	Fr

Head coach

- Mike Price

Coordinators/assistant coaches

- Mike Zimmer

Legend

- (C) Team captain
- (S) Suspended
- (I) Ineligible
- Injured
- Redshirt
