= Boise State–Idaho football rivalry =

American college football rivalry

- Boise State Broncos Idaho Vandals
- Sport: Football
- First meeting: September 11, 1971; Boise State, 42–14
- Latest meeting: November 12, 2010; Boise State, 52–14
- Next meeting: September 6, 2031
- Trophy: Governor's (since 2001)

Statistics
- Total meetings: 40
- All-time series: Boise State, 22–17–1 (.563)
- Largest victory: Boise State, 65–7 (2004)
- Longest win streak: 12, Boise State (1999–present); 12, Idaho (1982–1993)
- Current win streak: 12, Boise State (1999–present)

Locations of Idaho and Boise State

The Boise State–Idaho football rivalry was an intrastate college football rivalry in Idaho between the Broncos of Boise State University and Vandals of the University of Idaho in Moscow. The game was played annually 1971–2010, and with the exception of the 2001–2004 games, the rivalry was a conference game (Big Sky 1971–1995, Big West 1996–2000, and WAC 2005–2010). Boise State moved from the WAC to the Mountain West Conference in 2011 and the rivalry went on hiatus. The teams are scheduled to meet on September 6, 2031, and will take place in Boise.

The teams had played for the Governor's Trophy since 2001, won by BSU every year. In 2009, the game was televised nationally for the first time on ESPNU from Bronco Stadium in Boise. The fortieth and most recent game in the rivalry in 2010 was televised live in prime time on ESPN2 on Friday, November 12, from the Kibbie Dome in Moscow.

== Early games ==
The first meeting was 55 years ago in 1971, a season-opening night game at the year-old Bronco Stadium in Boise on September 11. The game was originally scheduled to be played in Moscow, but due to inclement weather in the spring, the Vandals' new stadium was a month behind schedule.

Idaho rented BSU's stadium and was the "home" team, but the "visiting" Broncos built a 28–7 lead at halftime and pulled off a convincing 42–14 upset before 16,123 for an instant rivalry. Tony Knap's Broncos went 10–2 in 1971 and won the Camellia Bowl, but their two losses were both in conference. Idaho went 8–3 for the best record to date in school history; Don Robbins' Vandals were Big Sky champions, won eight consecutive games (a school record), and had three players selected in the 1972 NFL draft.

The second game was played at the end of the 1972 season, again in Boise before 14,516 on the Saturday after Thanksgiving. The Vandals took a 7–0 halftime lead but Boise State responded in the third quarter with three touchdowns. Idaho returned an interception 75 yards for a touchdown and the Vandal freshman back-up quarterback ran for a touchdown with three minutes remaining to pull within a point; another run on the two-point conversion gave Idaho the win and evened the series at a game each. It was the first Big Sky home loss for the Broncos, who dropped to 7–4. Idaho finished 1972 at 4–7.

Bronco Stadium was expanded after the 1974 season and had the highest seating capacity in the Big Sky Conference. The rivalry contests with Idaho in Boise from 1976 through 1994 were the conferences' highest-attended games for those seasons.

== Streaks ==
The Boise State–Idaho rivalry has been dominated by streaks. Upstart underdog Boise State College of the College Division (Division II) easily won the initial game over University Division (Division I) Idaho in the season opener in 1971; it was Boise State's first-ever game against a University Division opponent. BSU became a university in 1974 and the Big Sky Conference moved to the new Division I-AA in 1978. BSU was 8–2–1 in the first eleven meetings with the Vandals, including five in a row (1977–81). Idaho immediately followed with twelve straight wins 1982–93, and won 15 of 17 thru 1998.

Boise State began its current 12-game winning streak in 1999, in which BSU has dominated the Vandals. The composite score for the most recent dozen games is 613–213, an average BSU victory margin of over 33 points per game, ranging from 14 to 58 points. Boise State has won 13 of 15 games over Idaho since both teams moved up to Division I-A (now FBS) in 1996. Idaho returned to FCS (and the Big Sky) in 2018.

== Governor's Trophy ==
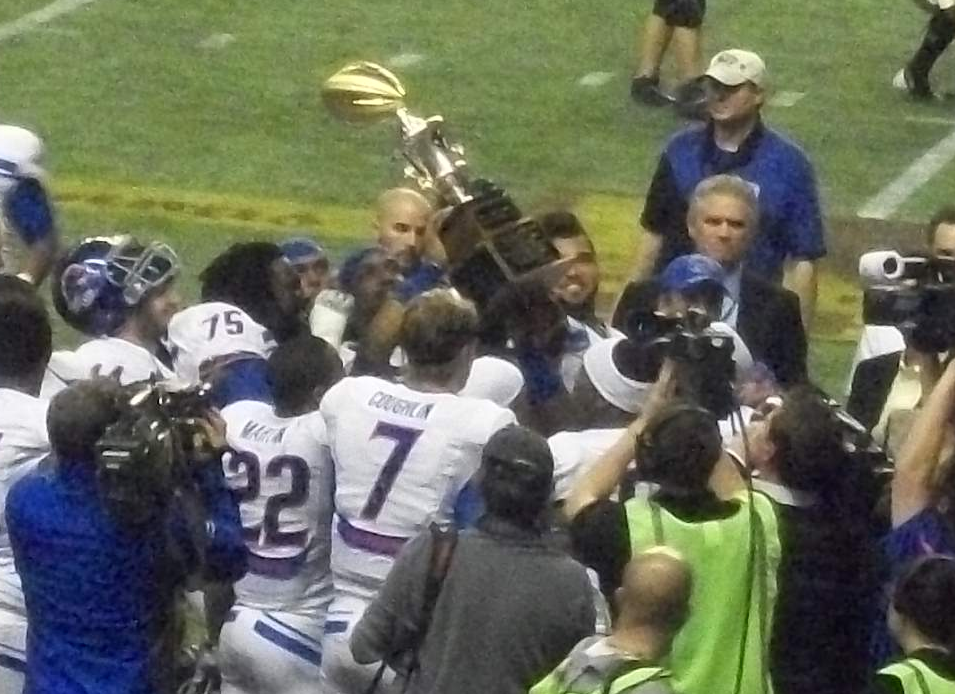
Boise State raises the Governor's Trophy again in 2010 at the Kibbie Dome in Moscow

When the Big West dropped football following the 2000 season, Boise State and Idaho joined different conferences. The Broncos moved up to the WAC, while Idaho joined the distant Sun Belt as a "football only" member (and remained in the Big West for all other sports). In an effort to keep the intrastate rivalry strong, then Governor Dirk Kempthorne, a UI alumnus (1975) and former student body president, commissioned the Governor's Trophy, a traveling trophy awarded to the winning team. Since its inception in 2001 for the 31st game, the trophy has yet to travel, as Boise State has won all ten games.

During the four seasons (2001–2004) as a non-conference game, it was played early in the season. Idaho joined the WAC in 2005 to return the rivalry to a late-season conference game. Idaho has never won the trophy; BSU has handily won all ten games played for it. Since the 2010 game, no games have been scheduled and none are scheduled for the immediate future.

A few months before the teams' most recent meeting in Moscow in 2010, BSU president Bob Kustra expressed his displeasure with the behavior of Idaho fans. He told the editorial board of the Idaho Statesman (Boise) that he and his wife no longer attended the series games in Moscow because Idaho fans had "a culture that is nasty, inebriated and civilly doesn't give our fans the respect that any fan should expect when visiting an away team." Subsequently, a Moscow bar sold T-shirts reading "Nasty, inebriated" for Idaho fans.

== Accomplishments ==
Team	Idaho	Boise State
Claimed National Titles	0	2
Unclaimed National Titles	0	2
Bowl appearances	3	19
Postseason bowl record	3–0 (1.00)	12–7 (.632)
Conference titles	10	20
All-time program record	460–614–26 (.430)	471–175–2 (.728)

== Game results ==
Boise State victories	Idaho victories	Tie games

No.	Date	Location	Winner	Score
1	September 11, 1971	Boise, ID	Boise State	42–14
2	November 25, 1972	Boise, ID	Idaho	22–21
3	September 15, 1973	Moscow, ID	Boise State	47–24
4	November 23, 1974	Boise, ID	#3 Boise State	53–29
5	October 11, 1975	Moscow, ID	Tie	31–31
6	September 11, 1976	Boise, ID	Idaho	16–9
7	November 26, 1977	Moscow, ID	#5 Boise State	44–14
8	November 4, 1978	Boise, ID	Boise State	48–10
9	October 13, 1979	Moscow, ID	Boise State	41–17
10	October 11, 1980	Boise, ID	Boise State	44–21
11	November 21, 1981	Moscow, ID	#4 Boise State	45–43
12	October 30, 1982	Boise, ID	#17 Idaho	24–17
13	November 19, 1983	Moscow, ID	Idaho	45–24
14	November 17, 1984	Boise, ID	Idaho	37–0
15	November 23, 1985	Moscow, ID	#5 Idaho	44–27
16	November 22, 1986	Boise, ID	#20 Idaho	21–14
17	November 21, 1987	Moscow, ID	#5 Idaho	40–34
18	November 19, 1988	Boise, ID	#2 Idaho	26–20
19	November 18, 1989	Moscow, ID	#5 Idaho	26–21
20	November 17, 1990	Boise, ID	#14 Idaho	21–14
21	November 23, 1991	Moscow, ID	Idaho	28–24

No.	Date	Location	Winner	Score
22	November 21, 1992	Boise, ID	#5 Idaho	62–16
23	November 20, 1993	Moscow, ID	#11 Idaho	49–16
24	November 19, 1994	Boise, ID	#6 Boise State	27–24
25	November 18, 1995	Moscow, ID	#25 Idaho	33–13
26	November 23, 1996	Boise, ID	Idaho	64–19
27	November 22, 1997	Moscow, ID	Boise State	30–23^{OT}
28	November 21, 1998	Boise, ID	Idaho	36–35^{OT}
29	November 20, 1999	Pullman, WA	Boise State	45–14
30	November 18, 2000	Boise, ID	Boise State	66–24
31	September 29, 2001	Pullman, WA	Boise State	45–13
32	August 31, 2002	Boise, ID	Boise State	38–21
33	September 13, 2003	Moscow, ID	Boise State	24–10
34	September 4, 2004	Boise, ID	Boise State	65–7
35	November 19, 2005	Boise, ID	Boise State	70–35
36	October 21, 2006	Moscow, ID	#18 Boise State	42–26
37	November 17, 2007	Boise, ID	#17 Boise State	58–14
38	November 15, 2008	Moscow, ID	#9 Boise State	45–10
39	November 14, 2009	Boise, ID	#6 Boise State	63–25
40	November 12, 2010	Moscow, ID	#4 Boise State	52–14
Series: Boise State leads 22–17–1

== Coaching records ==
Since first game in 1971

=== Boise State ===
Head coach	Team	Games	Seasons	Wins	Losses	Ties	Pct.
Tony Knap	Boise State	5	1968–1975	3	1	1	.700
Jim Criner	Boise State	7	1976–1982	5	2	0	.714
Lyle Setencich	Boise State	4	1983–1986	0	4		.000
Skip Hall	Boise State	6	1987–1992	0	6		.000
Pokey Allen	Boise State	4	1993–1996	1	3		.250
Houston Nutt	Boise State	1	1997	1	0		1.000
Dirk Koetter	Boise State	3	1998–2000	2	1		.667
Dan Hawkins	Boise State	5	2001–2005	5	0		1.000
Chris Petersen	Boise State	5	2006–2013	5	0		1.000
Bryan Harsin	Boise State	0	2014–2020				
Andy Avalos	Boise State	0	2021–2023				
Spencer Danielson	Boise State	0	2024–				

=== Idaho ===
Head coach	Team	Games	Seasons	Wins	Losses	Ties	Pct.
Don Robbins	Idaho	3	1970–1973	1	2	0	.333
Ed Troxel	Idaho	4	1974–1977	1	2	1	.375
Jerry Davitch	Idaho	4	1978–1981	0	4	0	.000
Dennis Erickson (a)	Idaho	4	1982–1985	4	0		1.000
Keith Gilbertson	Idaho	3	1986–1988	3	0		1.000
John L. Smith	Idaho	6	1989–1994	5	1		.833
Chris Tormey	Idaho	5	1995–1999	3	2		.600
Tom Cable	Idaho	4	2000–2003	0	4		.000
Nick Holt	Idaho	2	2004–2005	0	2		.000
Dennis Erickson (b)	Idaho	1	2006	0	1		.000
Robb Akey	Idaho	4	2007–2012	0	4		.000
Paul Petrino	Idaho	0	2013–2021				
Jason Eck	Idaho	0	2022–2024				
Thomas Ford	Idaho	0	2024–				

- Only tie was in 1975; the Big Sky enacted overtime for conference games in 1980, and all Division I games went to overtime in 1996.

== See also ==
- List of NCAA college football rivalry games
