= 1981 Montana State Bobcats football team =

American college football season

1981 Montana State Bobcats football
- Conference: Big Sky Conference
- Record: 3–7 (1–6 Big Sky)
- Head coach: Sonny Lubick (4th season)
- Home stadium: Reno H. Sales Stadium

1981 Big Sky Conference football standings
	Conf.					Overall
Team	W		L		T	W		L		T
No. 2 Idaho State $^	6	–	1	–	0	12	–	1	–	0
No. 5 Boise State ^	6	–	1	–	0	10	–	3	–	0
Montana	5	–	2	–	0	7	–	3	–	0
Nevada	4	–	3	–	0	7	–	4	–	0
Weber State	4	–	3	–	0	7	–	4	–	0
Northern Arizona	2	–	5	–	0	4	–	7	–	0
Montana State	1	–	6	–	0	3	–	7	–	0
Idaho	0	–	7	–	0	3	–	8	–	0
$ – Conference champion; ^ – NCAA Division I-AA playoff participant; Rankings from NCAA Division I-AA Committee poll

The 1981 Montana State Bobcats football team represented the Montana State University as a member of the Big Sky Conference during the 1981 NCAA Division I-AA football season. Led by Sonny Lubick in his fourth and final year as head coach, the Bobcats compiled an overall record of 3–7 and a mark of 1–6 in conference play, placing seventh in the Big Sky.

== Schedule ==
Date	Opponent	Site	Result	Attendance	Source
September 12	at Washington State*	Joe Albi Stadium; Spokane, WA	L 21–33	23,721	
September 19	Fresno State*	Reno H. Sales Stadium; Bozeman, MT	W 30–26		
September 26	Simon Fraser*	Reno H. Sales Stadium; Bozeman, MT	W 35–14	7,127	
October 3	Weber State	Reno H. Sales Stadium; Bozeman, MT	L 20–28		
October 10	at No. 7 Boise State	Bronco Stadium; Boise, ID	L 10–20	18,842	
October 17	Idaho	Reno H. Sales Stadium; Bozeman, MT	W 29–28	10,017	
October 24	at Northern Arizona	Walkup Skydome; Flagstaff, Arizona	L 14–20		
October 31	Montana	Reno H. Sales Stadium; Bozeman, MT	L 17–27	14,000	
November 7	at No. 2 Idaho State	ASISU Minidome; Pocatello, ID	L 3–31	10,468	
November 14	at Nevada	Mackay Stadium; Reno, NV	L 13–46	4,900	
*Non-conference game; Rankings from Associated Press Poll released prior to the game

== Roster ==
1981 Montana State Bobcats football team roster
Players
Coaches
Offense

Pos.	#	Name	Class
RB		Tony Boddie	Jr
WR	81	Mike Carle	Jr
WR	18	Britt Freeman	Sr
C		Larry Rubens	Sr
QB	12	Dennis Stauch	Sr

Defense

Pos.	#	Name	Class
DE		Mark Fellows	Fr
SS		Tim Sturdevant	Sr

Special teams

Pos.	#	Name	Class

Head coach

- Sonny Lubick

Coordinators/assistant coaches

Legend

- (C) Team captain
- (S) Suspended
- (I) Ineligible
- Injured
- Redshirt

Roster
