= Dennis Erickson =

American football coach (born 1947)

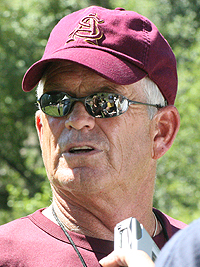
- Erickson in 2007

Personal information
- Born: March 24, 1947 (age 79); Everett, Washington, U.S.

Career information
- High school: Everett
- College: Montana State

Career history
- Montana State (1969) Graduate assistant; Billings Central Catholic HS (MT) (1970); Montana State (1971–1973) Assistant; Idaho (1974–1975) Offensive coordinator; Fresno State (1976–1978) Offensive coordinator; San Jose State (1979–1981) Offensive coordinator; Idaho (1982–1985) Head coach; Wyoming (1986) Head coach; Washington State (1987–1988) Head coach; Miami (FL) (1989–1994) Head coach; Seattle Seahawks (1995–1998) Head coach; Oregon State (1999–2002) Head coach; San Francisco 49ers (2003–2004) Head coach; Idaho (2006) Head coach; Arizona State (2007–2011) Head coach; South Albany HS (OR) (2012) Volunteer assistant; Utah (2013) Co-offensive coordinator & running backs coach; Utah (2014–2016) Assistant head coach & running backs coach; Salt Lake Stallions (2019) Head coach

Awards and highlights
- 2× national champion (1989, 1991); Big Sky champion (1985); 2× Pac-10 champion (2000, 2007); 3× Big East champion (1991–1992, 1994); 2× Sporting News College Football COY (1992, 2000); 3× Pac-10 Coach of the Year (1988, 2000, 2007); 3× Big East Coach of the Year (1991–1992, 1994); State of Washington Sports Hall of Fame (2017)

Head coaching record
- Regular season: 40–56 (NFL); 2–4 (AAF)
- Postseason: 5–7 (bowl); 1–2 (D-I-AA playoffs)
- Career: 179–96–1 (college); 40–56 (NFL); 2–5 (AAF)
- Coaching profile at Pro Football Reference
- College Football Hall of Fame

Dennis Brian Erickson (born March 24, 1947) is an American football coach who most recently served as the head coach for the Salt Lake Stallions of the Alliance of American Football (AAF) league. He was also the head coach at the University of Idaho (1982–1985, 2006), the University of Wyoming (1986), Washington State University (1987–1988), the University of Miami (1989–1994), Oregon State University (1999–2002), and Arizona State University (2007–2011). During his tenure at Miami, Erickson's teams won two national championships, in 1989 and 1991. A coach who won conference championships with four different programs, his record as a college football head coach is 179–96–1 (.650).

Erickson was also the head coach of two teams in the National Football League (NFL), the Seattle Seahawks (1995–1998) and the San Francisco 49ers (2003–2004), and tallied a mark of 40–56 (.417).

Erickson first retired on December 30, 2016, after 47 years in coaching. In 2018, the AAF named Erickson as the head coach of the Salt Lake Stallions, bringing him out of retirement until the league disbanded after eight games of what was meant to be a ten-game season.

== Early life ==
Erickson was raised in Ferndale, Washington, 100 miles (160 km) north of Seattle, and in Everett, 25 miles (40 km) north of Seattle. His father, Robert "Pinky" Erickson, was the head football coach at Ferndale High School and later at Cascade High School in Everett. The younger Erickson played quarterback at the rival Everett High, coached by next-door neighbor, Bill Dunn. This "made for some quiet dinners on game day." As a junior, Dennis was the starting quarterback, beating out the former starter, senior Mike Price, another future college head coach.

Price, the son of the head coach of Everett Junior College, was moved to defense as a safety. When Erickson left Washington State for Miami in 1989, he recommended Mike Price (who got the job) as his replacement, and Price rented Erickson's Pullman home. Erickson had beaten out Price for the Washington State job in 1987. Six years earlier in 1981, Price had beaten Erickson out for the job at Weber State College in Ogden, Utah. While at Idaho, Erickson was 2–2 in conference play against Price's Weber teams, and at Oregon State, he was 2–1 against Price's Washington State teams.

Erickson graduated from EHS in 1965 and accepted a football scholarship to Montana State in Bozeman to play for head coach Jim Sweeney, and was a member of the Sigma Alpha Epsilon fraternity. He was an effective undersized quarterback from 1966 to 1968, earning all-conference honors in the Big Sky. Immediately after his senior season, Erickson began his coaching career as a graduate assistant for the Bobcats in 1969. In 1970 at age 23, he was the head coach at Billings Central Catholic High School, staying for just a single season.

== Assistant coaching ==
From 1971 to 1981 Erickson was a college assistant coach, working with the offense. Beginning at his alma mater MSU in 1971 under Sonny Holland, he became an offensive coordinator in 1974 at the University of Idaho under newly promoted head coach, Ed Troxel, and stayed in Moscow for two seasons.

Erickson's college coach, Jim Sweeney, resigned from neighboring Washington State after the 1975 season, soon moved to Fresno State, and Erickson joined him as offensive coordinator for 1976. After two years, Sweeney left to become an assistant with the NFL's Oakland Raiders under John Madden, and Erickson continued at Fresno in 1978 under new head coach Bob Padilla.

When Jack Elway, a former Sweeney assistant at WSU, was hired at San Jose State in 1979, Erickson joined him for three seasons, again as the offensive coordinator. They instituted the spread offense, which Elway had picked up from his son John's high school head coach, Jack Neumeier. Erickson was a finalist for the Weber State job after the 1980 season, but lost out to high school teammate and friend Mike Price; he finally got his head coaching chance following the 1981 season.

== Head coaching ==
=== College ===
==== Idaho ====
Erickson's head coaching career began at age 34 at the University of Idaho on December 11, 1981, succeeding Jerry Davitch, who had been fired nine days prior to his final game (a one-point home loss against rival Boise State). A pre-season playoff pick in Davitch's fourth season, Idaho finished 1981 with six consecutive losses, winless in all seven games in the Big Sky. Erickson was hired by UI athletic director Bill Belknap and accepted a one-year contract at $38,001.

Building on his reputation as an offensive innovator, Erickson became Idaho's all-time winningest head coach in just four seasons with the Vandals (1982–85), taking them to the I-AA playoffs in his first and fourth seasons. In his first season of 1982, Erickson took an underachieving (and injured) 3–8 team in 1981 and immediately turned it into an 8–3 playoff team, led by decathlete quarterback Ken Hobart. Erickson's overall record with the Vandals was 32–15 (.680), 31–13 (.704) in the regular season and 1–2 in post season. He went 4–0 in the rivalry game with Boise State, a team which had dominated the series by winning the previous five games. (The winning streak against the Broncos reached 12 games; it was broken in 1994 when BSU advanced to the I-AA finals.)

His most notable recruits at Idaho were his quarterbacks – future NFL head coach Scott Linehan, who had future Oakland Raiders head coach Tom Cable blocking for him, and future College Football Hall of Famer John Friesz, who had Mark Schlereth blocking for him. Erickson revived Vandal football and quickly turned it into a top I-AA program, whose success was continued for another decade by former assistants Keith Gilbertson (1986–88) and John L. Smith (1989–94).

Before 1982, the Vandals had posted only four winning seasons in over four decades, and had not had consecutive winning seasons since 1938. Idaho had three consecutive winning seasons only once (1903–05), and never had four. With Erickson's arrival as head coach, the program embarked on 15 consecutive winning seasons (1982–96), and eleven trips to the Division I-AA playoffs in fourteen seasons, including two appearances in the semifinals (1988, 1993).

Erickson's compensation for his fourth and final year at Idaho in 1985 was $47,940.

In 2018, he was inducted into the University of Idaho Athletics Hall of Fame.

==== Wyoming ====
On December 2, 1985, Erickson was introduced as the head coach of the Wyoming Cowboys. His four-year contract included a base annual salary of $60,000 plus $20,000 from radio and television, and the rent-free use of a home in Laramie. The Division I-A Cowboys had just concluded 3–8 season in 1985, tied for seventh in the nine-team WAC.

Erickson installed his "Air Express" form of the spread offense and led the Cowboys to 3–1 start in September, with road wins at Air Force and Wisconsin. Wyoming finished at 6–6 season in 1986, tied for fourth in the WAC with a 4–4 record. Erickson was approached by several teams during the winter. When the Washington State job opened up with Jim Walden accepting the head coaching job at Iowa State, Erickson decided to agree to join the Cougars in early January; the news broke out before Erickson could tell his players, which he later stated was among his big regrets.

==== Washington State ====
When introduced as the head coach of the Washington State Cougars of the Pac-10 on January 7, 1987, Erickson stated that it was his lifelong goal to be the head coach at WSU. His contract at WSU in 1987 was a five-year deal at an annual base salary of $70,000, with up to $30,000 from radio, television, and speaking engagements. He returned to the Palouse after just 13 months in Wyoming, then led the Cougars to 3–7–1 in his first year, the same record the Cougars had the year before under Jim Walden. Erickson turned around the Washington State program quickly, going 9–3 in 1988 with a post-season victory in the Aloha Bowl, WSU's first bowl win since the 1916 Rose Bowl. Erickson's continued success led to his hiring by the University of Miami in March 1989, although a week before he stated he was not leaving WSU.

==== Miami ====
Expectations were very high at Miami, as Erickson replaced the successful Jimmy Johnson, who had led the Hurricanes to ten or more wins each the previous four seasons and a national championship in 1987 before departing for the NFL's Dallas Cowboys. Erickson led Miami for six seasons (1989–1994), winning an undisputed national championship in 1989 and sharing the title with Washington in 1991. That gave Erickson more national championships than any other Miami coach. Erickson's .875 winning percentage (63–9) at Miami remains the highest in the history of the program.

Erickson's tenure crested with the 1991 shared title. A year later, the Hurricanes rolled through the regular season undefeated for the second year in a row behind Heisman Trophy-winning quarterback Gino Torretta. They went into the 1993 Sugar Bowl, the first Bowl Coalition national title game, as heavy favorites against Alabama. However, Alabama routed Miami 34-13, ending Miami's 29-game winning streak dating to 1990. His 1993 team went 9–3, the first season with fewer than ten wins for Miami since 1985. That team was drubbed 29–0 by Arizona in the 1994 Fiesta Bowl. In September 1994, the Hurricanes lost, 38–20, to Washington at the Orange Bowl, snapping the Canes' NCAA record 58-game home win streak dating to 1985.

Moreover, in 1991 Miami self-reported rampant violations of NCAA rules dating back to 1985, Johnson's second year. However, when it emerged that an academic adviser had helped players fraudulently obtain Pell Grants, the federal government asked Miami to stop its probe so the Department of Education could conduct an investigation of its own. Ultimately, Miami was placed on three years' probation not long after Erickson left the school, banned from postseason play in 1995 and docked 31 scholarships over three years. Erickson himself was not implicated in wrongdoing.

In 2005, he was inducted into the University of Miami Sports Hall of Fame. Erickson was interviewed about his time at the University of Miami for the documentary The U, which premiered December 12, 2009, on ESPN.

=== NFL ===
==== Seattle ====
After turning down offers from both the Denver Broncos and Philadelphia Eagles, Erickson accepted an offer to coach the Seattle Seahawks in January 1995 for about $1 million per year, compared to the estimated $700,000 in his final year at Miami. In his first season, he switched starting quarterbacks from the #2 overall pick in the 1993 NFL draft, Rick Mirer, and went to John Friesz, whom he recruited to Idaho in 1985. Friesz guided the Seahawks to their second biggest comeback win ever in a game, rallying from 20–0 down at the half after Mirer had started, and took the Seahawks to the final week of the season with an 8–7 record after starting 2–6 and a playoff berth on the line only to lose to Kansas City and finish 8–8. In 1996, the Seahawks finished 7–9, Erickson's worst record with the team. 1997 saw an ownership change in Seattle, in which Microsoft co-founder Paul G. Allen purchased the team from then owner Ken Behring and helped pass a referendum for a new stadium to be built; that season, the Seahawks had one of the best passing offenses in the league, only to finish 8–8 after an 0–2 start in which they were outscored 76–17 in two home losses. After the season, Erickson, who had been told by new owner Paul Allen that he would return in 1998, had to fire longtime friend and assistant the special teams coach Dave Arnold and replace him with Pete Rodriguez.

With a revamped lineup led by 1997 passing leader Warren Moon, the Hawks flew out of the gate in 1998 with a three-game winning streak (including a Kickoff Weekend shutout of the Eagles at Veterans Stadium), but stumbled and lost their next three games. Later in the year, with the team playing at .500, he turned to Jon Kitna to lead the offense, and they responded with a close win at home against the Tennessee Oilers before going on the road to New York to play the Jets. In a hotly contested game that many viewed as the best combined offensive performances of 1998, the game came down to a blown call on a short touchdown run by Jets quarterback Vinny Testaverde (where he was ruled to have scored despite replay evidence clearly showing his forward progress had been stopped short of the goal line), which cost Seattle the game and Erickson his job. This game would be cited as one of the main reasons the NFL restored its instant replay review system following the season.

The final year of Erickson's NFL contract for 1999 was valued at $1.3 million.

=== Return to the college ranks ===
==== Oregon State ====
In January 1999, Erickson returned to the college ranks when he was hired at Oregon State University in Corvallis, with a five-year contract at $300,000 per year. The OSU Beavers had become one of three perennial "cellar dwellers" in the Pacific-10 Conference; expectations were so low that Erickson's predecessor, Mike Riley, was promoted to an NFL head coaching position with the San Diego Chargers after leading the Beavers to a 5–6 record in 1998.

In his first season, Erickson directed the Beavers to a 7–5 record, the program's first winning season in 29 years. They secured an invitation to the Oahu Bowl—their first bowl appearance in 35 years, and Erickson received an improved contract.

The following year, Oregon State went 11–1, snapped a 33-year losing streak to the USC Trojans, and earned a share of the Pac-10 conference championship for the first time since the conference expanded to ten teams in 1978. It was the first time the Beavers won at least a share of a conference championship since 1964. Oregon State began to develop a national reputation for its high-powered offense and a swarming defense. In fact, the team barely missed an invitation to play in the national BCS title game due to a late-in-the-game missed field goal against Washington. The win over USC did, however, help Erickson's crew clinch a spot in the Fiesta Bowl against the Notre Dame Fighting Irish—the Beavers' first major-bowl appearance since the 1965 Rose Bowl. Oregon State won 41–9, in what is generally considered to be one of Erickson's crowning career achievements.

At the close of the 2000 season's bowl games, the Beavers were ranked fourth nationally in the AP Poll, their highest final ranking ever. Some media outlets suggested Oregon State would have been a favorite to win the BCS Championship at the Orange Bowl had they been selected.

Before the 2001 season, Sports Illustrated ranked Oregon State as the number one team in the nation. However, a lack of returning talent from the 2000 team took its toll, and the Beavers went 5–6. Among the players who hail from Erickson's high-octane 2000 team are NFL stars Chad Johnson and T. J. Houshmandzadeh; both were selected in the 2001 NFL draft by the Cincinnati Bengals.

Erickson was named Sporting News National Coach of the Year in 2000, and his name came up for several high-profile college football positions. In late 2000, Erickson was a primary choice to fill the vacant position at USC, however he spurned a $7.2 million, five-year contract to remain with the Beavers, and the position eventually went to Pete Carroll.

Erickson remained coach at Oregon State for four seasons (1999–2002) before accepting another coaching position in the NFL. His early departure left some OSU fans angry with him for not finishing-out his contract, but he is still credited with playing a leading role in reviving the Beavers football program. Mike Riley returned to Corvallis to succeed Erickson as head coach in 2003.

In 2020, he was inducted into the Beavers Athletic Hall of Fame.

=== Return to the NFL ===
==== San Francisco ====
Erickson returned to the NFL in February 2003 with the San Francisco 49ers, and received a five-year contract at $2.5 million per year. The 49ers had serious salary cap problems, and Erickson lasted just two seasons before being fired, along with general manager Terry Donahue, after a 2–14 season in 2004. The hiring of Erickson was very surprising and highly criticized by the fans and the media after a longer-than-usual coaching search to replace the fired coach Steve Mariucci. This move was the first strong indicator that the fans believed that John York was not cut out to be the owner of the team after taking over the franchise from his brother-in-law Edward J. DeBartolo, Jr. in 2000. The search began without much direction and several candidates in the coaching search withdrew from consideration. When the 49ers had reportedly named their finalists, three defensive coordinators were named. But the offensive-minded Erickson ended up being hired and due to the timing of the hiring, Erickson did not have the time to properly assemble his coaching staff. The 49ers' offense had mostly players who specialized in the West Coast Offense that Mariucci ran. But the aggressive style of offense that Erickson is known for deviated greatly from that scheme and the hybrid scheme that Erickson tried to employ in order to maintain parts of the West Coast Offense and ease the transition to his offense never worked out. After two seasons, Erickson was fired with three years remaining on his contract; he did not coach during the 2005 season.

=== Second return to college ranks ===
==== Return to Idaho ====
On February 8, 2006, the University of Idaho announced the re-hiring of Erickson as its head football coach. Erickson had won 32 games in his first four seasons as a head coach (1982–85) to establish Idaho as a top I-AA program in the Big Sky Conference. The Vandals moved up to Division I-A in 1996 but had not had a winning season since 1999. Idaho had just completed its first season in the WAC in 2005 when previous head coach Nick Holt resigned in early February, after just two seasons. He left to take a higher paying assistant's job in the NFL, as the defensive line coach for the St. Louis Rams under new head coach Scott Linehan, a former Vandal quarterback and offensive coordinator. After a few days, Holt reconsidered and accepted another job back at USC, as defensive coordinator under Pete Carroll for even more money, more than double his salary at Idaho.

When asked at his introductory press conference if Idaho was indeed a long-term arrangement, Erickson responded, "You want to look at the age on my driver's license?...This, hopefully, is going to be my last job." Erickson's rejuvenated 2006 Vandals broke to a 4–3 record and were and 3–0 in the WAC, then lost the final five conference games to finish at 4–8 overall and sixth in the WAC. Erickson was paid $215,000 by Idaho and nearly $2.3 million by the 49ers for the fourth year of his NFL contract.

==== Arizona State ====
After just ten months back at Idaho, Erickson left again for the opportunity to lead his fourth BCS program. Arizona State athletic director Lisa Love hired him on December 9 to replace recently fired Dirk Koetter, who had finished the 2006 regular season at 7–5. Arizona State was Erickson's third head coaching stint in the Pac-10, after Washington State and Oregon State.

Arizona State paid $2.8 million to Koetter and a $150,000 buyout to Idaho to complete the hiring of Erickson to a five-year contract. He immediately paid dividends at ASU, leading the Sun Devils to a 10–2 regular season record in 2007, a share of the Pac-10 title, and a berth in the Holiday Bowl. Erickson was named the Pac-10 Coach of the Year; the first to ever win the award at three different Pac-10 schools. He also coached another major award winner; placekicker Thomas Weber was named the Lou Groza Award winner. Erickson worked for the relatively low salary of $500,000 from ASU in his first season, with another $2 million paid by the 49ers for the last year of his NFL contract. The remaining four years of the original ASU contract paid $1.275 million per year. In 2008 the Arizona Board of Regents had approved a contract extension to keep Erickson at Arizona State through June 2012.

Erickson's early success at ASU was not sustained, as the Sun Devils failed to have another winning season and lost three of four Territorial Cup rivalry games against Arizona. In his final four seasons, Erickson was 21–28 overall and 14–22 in conference. After opening the 2011 season with a promising 6–2 record, Arizona State suffered four straight Pac-12 defeats in November to end the regular season, and Erickson was fired on November 28. He was allowed to coach in their bowl game on December 22, but ASU was soundly beaten 56–24 by Boise State in the Maaco Bowl in Las Vegas for their fifth consecutive loss.

=== Third return to college ranks ===
In February 2013, Erickson came out of retirement to join the staff at the University of Utah as the co-offensive coordinator with Brian Johnson under head coach Kyle Whittingham. In announcing the hire, Erickson is quoted "Being around football players and coaches has been my life and that's why I am coming out of retirement, I will do whatever I can to help the players and coaches at Utah be successful and I am excited to get back out on the football field." Erickson retired on December 30, 2016, after 47 years of coaching.

=== Alliance of American Football ===
In 2018, Erickson was named the head coach of the Salt Lake Stallions, a team part of the Alliance of American Football, set to play in 2019. On April 2, 2019, the AAF suspended operations, and went bankrupt on April 17.

== Family ==
Erickson and his wife, Marilyn, have two sons: Bryce and Ryan. Erickson hired Bryce to the Arizona State staff, as a graduate assistant for his first two seasons. In 2012, Bryce became the head coach at South Albany High School in Albany, Oregon. Later that year, he was hired as an assistant coach for Idaho.

== Head coaching record ==
=== College ===
Year	Team	Overall	Conference	Standing	Bowl/playoffs	Coaches^{#}	AP^{°}
Idaho Vandals (Big Sky Conference) (1982–1985)
1982	Idaho	9–4	5–2	T–1st	L NCAA Division I-AA Quarterfinal		
1983	Idaho	8–3	4–3	T–3rd			
1984	Idaho	6–5	4–3	T–3rd			
1985	Idaho	9–3	6–1	1st	L NCAA Division I-AA First Round		
Wyoming Cowboys (Western Athletic Conference) (1986)
1986	Wyoming	6–6	4–4	T–4th			
Wyoming:		6–6	4–4				
Washington State Cougars (Pacific-10 Conference) (1987–1988)
1987	Washington State	3–7–1	1–5–1	9th			
1988	Washington State	9–3	5–3	T–3rd	W Aloha	16	16
Washington State:		12–10–1	6–8–1				
Miami Hurricanes (NCAA Division I-A Independent) (1989–1990)
1989	Miami	11–1			W Sugar	1	1
1990	Miami	10–2			W Cotton	3	3
Miami Hurricanes (Big East Conference) (1991–1994)
1991	Miami	12–0	2–0	1st	W Orange	2	1
1992	Miami	11–1	4–0	1st	L Sugar^{†}	3	3
1993	Miami	9–3	6–1	2nd	L Fiesta^{†}	15	15
1994	Miami	10–2	7–0	1st	L Orange^{†}	6	6
Miami:		63–9	19–1				
Oregon State Beavers (Pacific-10 Conference) (1999–2002)
1999	Oregon State	7–5	4–4	5th	L Oahu		
2000	Oregon State	11–1	7–1	T–1st	W Fiesta^{†}	5	4
2001	Oregon State	5–6	3–5	7th			
2002	Oregon State	8–5	4–4	T–4th	L Insight		
Oregon State:		31–17	18–14				
Idaho Vandals (Western Athletic Conference) (2006)
2006	Idaho	4–8	3–5	6th			
Idaho:		36–23	22–14				
Arizona State Sun Devils (Pacific-10/Pac-12 Conference) (2007–2011)
2007	Arizona State	10–3	7–2	T–1st	L Holiday	13	16
2008	Arizona State	5–7	4–5	T–6th			
2009	Arizona State	4–8	2–7	9th			
2010	Arizona State	6–6	4–5	T–5th			
2011	Arizona State	6–7	4–5	T–3rd (South)	L Maaco		
Arizona State:		31–31	21–24				
Total:		179–96–1					
National championship Conference title Conference division title or championship game berth
^{†}Indicates Bowl Coalition, Bowl Alliance or BCS bowl.; ^{#}Rankings from final Coaches Poll.; ^{°}Rankings from final AP Poll.

=== NFL ===
Team	Year	Regular season					Postseason			
Team	Year	Won	Lost	Ties	Win %	Finish	Won	Lost	Win %	Result
SEA	1995	8	8	0	.500	3rd in AFC West	–	–	–	–
SEA	1996	7	9	0	.438	4th in AFC West	–	–	–	–
SEA	1997	8	8	0	.500	3rd in AFC West	–	–	–	–
SEA	1998	8	8	0	.500	3rd in AFC West	–	–	–	–
SEA Total		31	33	0	.484		-	-	-	
SF	2003	7	9	0	.438	3rd in NFC West	–	–	–	–
SF	2004	2	14	0	.125	4th in NFC West	–	–	–	–
SF Total		9	23	0	.281		-	-	-	
Total		40	56	0	.417					

=== AAF ===
Team	Year	Regular season					Postseason			
Team	Year	Won	Lost	Ties	Win %	Finish	Won	Lost	Win %	Result
SL	2019	2	5	0	.286					

== See also ==
- List of college football head coaches with non-consecutive tenure
