= Mike Machurek =

American football player (born 1960)

No. 19
- Position: Quarterback

Personal information
- Born: July 22, 1960 (age 66); Las Vegas, Nevada, U.S.
- Listed height: 6 ft 1 in (1.85 m)
- Listed weight: 205 lb (93 kg)

Career information
- High school: James Madison (San Diego, California)
- College: Idaho State
- NFL draft: 1982: 6th round, 154th overall pick

Career history
- Detroit Lions (1982–1984)

Awards and highlights
- National champion (Div. I-AA, 1981); All-American (Div. I-AA, 1981); All-Big Sky (1981); second-team (1980)

Career NFL statistics
- Games played: 4
- Passing yards: 193
- Stats at Pro Football Reference

Michael Bruce Machurek (born July 22, 1960) is an American former professional football player who was a quarterback for the Detroit Lions of the National Football League (NFL). He played college football for the Idaho State Bengals.

== Career ==
Born in Las Vegas, Nevada, Machurek was raised in San Diego, California. He graduated from its James Madison High School in 1978 and played his first two college seasons at San Diego City College (1978–79). As a junior college transfer, Machurek then played for two seasons at Idaho State University (ISU) in Pocatello under new head coach Dave Kragthorpe. The team had just gone 0–11 under prior head coach Bud Hake.

Machurek was second-team All-Big Sky as a junior in 1980, and the Bengals were a much improved 6–5. As a senior in 1981, he was undefeated as a starter (12–0) and was a first-team Kodak All-American selection. Machurek missed a road game at Montana in mid-October due to mononucleosis; with backup Dirk Koetter at quarterback, the Bengals lost by three points on a late field goal. After a timely idle week, Machurek returned and led ISU to seven straight victories, as the team won the Division I-AA championship.

Machurek was a sixth round selection in the 1982 NFL draft; he was on the Lions' active roster for three seasons (1982–1984). In 1985 he was placed on injured reserve with a rotator cuff problem. For the Lions, Machurek appeared in four games, all in 1984, completing 14 of 43 passes for 193 yards and six interceptions.

== Personal life ==
In July 1983, Machurek underwent several surgeries for skin cancer (second degree melanoma). He was inducted to the ISU Hall of Fame in 1991 and the Ring of Honor in 1999. Machurek is married to Leslie and has two daughters, Candace and Madison.
