= 1981 Nevada Wolf Pack football team =

American college football season

1981 Nevada Wolf Pack football
- Conference: Big Sky Conference
- Record: 7–4 (4–3 Big Sky)
- Head coach: Chris Ault (6th season)
- Defensive coordinator: John L. Smith (5th season)
- Home stadium: Mackay Stadium

1981 Big Sky Conference football standings
	Conf.					Overall
Team	W		L		T	W		L		T
No. 2 Idaho State $^	6	–	1	–	0	12	–	1	–	0
No. 5 Boise State ^	6	–	1	–	0	10	–	3	–	0
Montana	5	–	2	–	0	7	–	3	–	0
Nevada	4	–	3	–	0	7	–	4	–	0
Weber State	4	–	3	–	0	7	–	4	–	0
Northern Arizona	2	–	5	–	0	4	–	7	–	0
Montana State	1	–	6	–	0	3	–	7	–	0
Idaho	0	–	7	–	0	3	–	8	–	0
$ – Conference champion; ^ – NCAA Division I-AA playoff participant; Rankings from NCAA Division I-AA Committee poll

The 1981 Nevada Wolf Pack football team represented the University of Nevada, Reno during the 1981 NCAA Division I-AA football season. Nevada competed as a member of the Big Sky Conference (BSC). The Wolf Pack were led by sixth-year head coach Chris Ault and played their home games at Mackay Stadium.

== Schedule ==
Date	Opponent	Site	Result	Attendance	Source
September 12	North Dakota*	Mackay Stadium; Reno, NV	L 11–17	9,754	
September 19	Cal Poly*	Mackay Stadium; Reno, NV	W 33–3	8,542	
September 26	at No. 3 Idaho State	ASISU Minidome; Pocatello, ID	L 7–23	9,833	
October 3	Central Arkansas*	Mackay Stadium; Reno, NV	W 63–13	8,225	
October 10	at Northern Arizona	Walkup Skydome; Flagstaff, AZ	W 34–17	13,000	
October 17	Weber State	Mackay Stadium; Reno, NV	W 28–14	10,254	
October 24	at Idaho	Kibbie Dome; Moscow, ID	W 23–14	14,000	
October 31	No. 4 Boise State	Mackay Stadium; Reno, NV (rivalry)	L 3–13	14,325	
November 7	at No. 9 Montana	Dornblaser Field; Missoula, MT	L 26–33	7,900	
November 14	Montana State	Mackay Stadium; Reno, NV	W 46–13	4,900	
November 21	at Cal State Fullerton*	Titan Field; Fullerton, CA	W 36–34	2,500	
*Non-conference game; Rankings from NCAA Division I-AA Football Committee Poll released prior to the game
