= Mike Price =

American football player and coach (born 1946)

Biographical details
- Born: April 6, 1946 (age 80); Denver, Colorado, U.S.

Playing career
- 1965–1966: Washington State
- 1967–1968: Puget Sound
- Positions: Quarterback, defensive back

Coaching career (HC unless noted)
- 1969–1970: Washington State (GA)
- 1971–1973: Puget Sound (OC)
- 1974–1977: Washington State (RB)
- 1978–1980: Missouri (QB/WR)
- 1981–1988: Weber State
- 1989–2002: Washington State
- 2003 (Note: Price was hired in December 2002 and dismissed in May 2003 before the start of Alabama's season.): Alabama
- 2004–2012: UTEP
- 2017: UTEP (interim HC)

Head coaching record
- Overall: 177–190
- Bowls: 3–5

Accomplishments and honors

Championships
- 2 Pac-10 (1997, 2002)

Awards
- Bobby Dodd Coach of the Year Award (1997); Eddie Robinson Coach of the Year (1997); Home Depot Coach of the Year Award (1997); Sporting News College Football COY (1997); 2× Pac-10 Coach of the Year (1997, 2001)

Michael Bruce Price (born April 6, 1946) is an American former college football coach. He was the head football coach at Weber State College from 1981 to 1988, Washington State University from 1989 to 2002, and the University of Texas at El Paso (UTEP) from 2004 to 2012. Price returned to UTEP as interim head coach for the final seven games of the 2017 season. He was hired at the University of Alabama in December 2002, but was fired before coaching a game in 2003.

== Early life ==
Born in Colorado, Price grew up in Everett, Washington, 25 miles (40 km) north of Seattle. He was the son of Walt Price, the longtime head football coach at Everett Junior College. At Everett High School, Price was a teammate of Dennis Erickson, the son of Pinky Erickson, the head coach at cross-town rival Cascade High. Everett High was coached by Bill Dunn, a next-door neighbor of the Ericksons. Dennis Erickson was a year behind Price, but took his job as starting quarterback midway through Price's senior year, and Price was moved to defense as a safety. The team finished 9–1. Price went on to play at Everett Junior College, Washington State, and finally at Puget Sound, where he co-captained the football team and was a member of the Phi Delta Theta fraternity.

Price met his wife, the former Joyce Taylor, in kindergarten in the early 1950s. They were married at age 19 and they had three children: two sons (who were his assistant coaches) and a daughter.

== Assistant coaching career ==
Price started his coaching career in 1969 as a graduate assistant for two seasons at Washington State, then was the offensive coordinator at his alma mater, UPS, for three. He returned to WSU for four seasons in 1974 as the running backs coach, and in his first months on staff landed what would be one of the greatest recruits in school history, quarterback Jack Thompson out of Evergreen High in Seattle. Price also successfully recruited future baseball hall-of-famer Ryne Sandberg to play quarterback for the Cougars but Sandberg chose to sign a contract out of high school with the Philadelphia Phillies. His final job as an assistant was at Missouri under head coach Warren Powers, where he coached the quarterbacks and wide receivers for three years, from 1978 to 1980.

== Head coaching career ==
=== Weber State ===
Following the 1980 season, Price landed his first head coaching position at Weber State of the Big Sky Conference, a job for which friend Dennis Erickson was also a finalist. Erickson would get the Idaho job the next year, and returned the favor (following the 1986 season) by beating out Price for the Washington State job. Upon leaving just two years later for Miami, Erickson recommended Price, who got the WSU job and then rented Erickson's Pullman home. Price was at Weber State through 1988, compiling a 46–44 (.511) record in eight seasons. His best year was 1987, when the Wildcats went 9–2 (6–1 in conference), and advanced to the quarterfinals of the Division I-AA playoffs to finish at 10–3.

=== Washington State ===
In March 1989, Price was hired by WSU Athletic Director Jim Livengood to be head coach of the Washington State team. Price and Livengood had been friends since 1964 when they both played quarterback at Everett Junior College. Price was chosen over former Washington assistant coach Ray Dorr.

On the field, Price was noted for his historic success at Washington State, where he served for fourteen seasons (1989–2002) and compiled an 83–78 (.516) record, with three ten-win seasons and five bowl appearances. His last two seasons at "Wazzu" combined for a 20–5 record (13–3 in the Pac-10). Price's 2002 team compiled a 7–1 mark in the conference and advanced to the Rose Bowl, where they were defeated by the Oklahoma Sooners 34–14. Five years earlier in 1997, Price was named National Coach of the Year, as the Cougars returned to the Rose Bowl after more than sixty years. Price, who also guided WSU to the 2003 Rose Bowl, calls the 1998 Rose Bowl his greatest coaching achievement. During his tenure at Washington State, he mentored some of the greatest players in the school's history, including quarterbacks Drew Bledsoe, Ryan Leaf, and Jason Gesser.

Prior to his departure, Price had recently signed a five-year contract at a base salary of $600,000 per year. With incentives, his compensation exceeded $900,000 in his final season at WSU. His original contract in 1989 was a four-year deal at $75,000 per year with unspecified television and radio revenues.

=== Alabama ===
Price may be best known nationally for an off-the-field incident during his brief stint at Alabama. In December 2002, he was hired in principle to replace Dennis Franchione as the head coach of the Crimson Tide. Price was at Alabama during the 2003 spring practice, but in May his contract was rescinded shortly after news reports surfaced of Price being seen at a strip club during a trip to Pensacola, Florida, where Price was playing in a golf tournament, and he also had about $1,000 charged to his hotel room by an unknown woman staying in the room. This development came on the heels of an earlier reprimand for visiting campus-area bars and drinking into the early hours in Tuscaloosa.

=== UTEP ===
On December 21, 2003, Texas-El Paso announced the hiring of Price as its new head coach.

In his first season in 2004, he led the Miners to an 8–4 record and a berth in the Houston Bowl, where they lost to Colorado. It was a significant turnaround for the Miners, who had won only two games in each of their previous three seasons. UTEP earned its first-ever ranking in the AP Poll in 2004, rising as high as 23rd in early November. Price was a finalist for Eddie Robinson Award and the Paul "Bear" Bryant Award for coach of the year. His starting salary at UTEP in 2004 was $225,000 plus incentives.

In 2010, Price became the second coach to take UTEP to three bowl games, after Mike Brumbelow, who led the Miners to the hometown Sun Bowl after the 1953, 1954, and 1956 seasons.

Days before the final game of the 2012 season, Price announced his retirement. He returned as interim coach midway through the 2017 season following the departure of Sean Kugler, who had resigned after the fifth game; UTEP went winless for the season.

== Head coaching record ==
Year	Team	Overall	Conference	Standing	Bowl/playoffs	Coaches^{#}	AP^{°}
Weber State Wildcats (Big Sky Conference) (1981–1988)
1981	Weber State	7–4	4–3	T–4th			
1982	Weber State	4–7	2–5	7th			
1983	Weber State	6–5	4–3	T–5th			
1984	Weber State	5–6	3–4	6th			
1985	Weber State	6–5	4–3	4th			
1986	Weber State	3–8	2–5	T–6th			
1987	Weber State	10–3	6–1	2nd	L NCAA Division I-AA Quarterfinal		
1988	Weber State	5–6	3–4	T–4th			
Weber State:		46–44	28–28				
Washington State Cougars (Pacific-10 Conference) (1989–2002)
1989	Washington State	6–5	3–5	8th			
1990	Washington State	3–8	2–6	9th			
1991	Washington State	4–7	3–5	T–6th			
1992	Washington State	9–3	5–3	T–3rd	W Copper	17	15
1993	Washington State	5–6	3–5	7th			
1994	Washington State	8–4	5–3	4th	W Alamo	19	21
1995	Washington State	3–8	2–6	T–8th			
1996	Washington State	5–6	3–5	T–8th			
1997	Washington State	10–2	7–1	T–1st	L Rose	9	9
1998	Washington State	3–8	0–8	10th			
1999	Washington State	3–9	1–7	10th			
2000	Washington State	4–7	2–6	T–8th			
2001	Washington State	10–2	6–2	T–2nd	W Sun	11	10
2002	Washington State	10–3	7–1	T–1st	L Rose^{†}	10	10
Washington State:		83–78	49–63				
UTEP Miners (Western Athletic Conference) (2004)
2004	UTEP	8–4	6–2	2nd	L Houston		
UTEP Miners (Conference USA) (2005–2012)
2005	UTEP	8–4	5–3	2nd (West)	L GMAC		
2006	UTEP	5–7	3–5	5th (West)			
2007	UTEP	4–8	2–6	5th (West)			
2008	UTEP	5–7	4–4	4th (West)			
2009	UTEP	4–8	3–5	T–3rd (West)			
2010	UTEP	6–7	3–5	T–4th (West)	L New Mexico		
2011	UTEP	5–7	2–6	5th (West)			
2012	UTEP	3–9	2–6	T–5th (West)			
UTEP Miners (Conference USA) (2017)
2017	UTEP	0–7	0–7	7th (West)			
UTEP:		48–68	30–49				
Total:		177–190					
National championship Conference title Conference division title or championship game berth
^{†}Indicates BCS bowl.; ^{#}Rankings from final Coaches Poll.; ^{°}Rankings from final AP Poll.
