= 1981 Idaho State Bengals football team =

American college football season

1981 Idaho State Bengals football

NCAA Division I-AA champion Big Sky champion

Division I-AA Championship Game, W 34–23 vs. Eastern Kentucky
- Conference: Big Sky Conference

Ranking
- AP: No. 2
- Record: 12–1 (6–1 Big Sky)
- Head coach: Dave Kragthorpe (2nd season)
- Offensive coordinator: Jim Koetter (2nd season)
- Offensive scheme: West Coast
- Defensive coordinator: Denny Moller (1st season)
- Base defense: 3–4
- Home stadium: ASISU Minidome

1981 Big Sky Conference football standings
	Conf.					Overall
Team	W		L		T	W		L		T
No. 2 Idaho State $^	6	–	1	–	0	12	–	1	–	0
No. 5 Boise State ^	6	–	1	–	0	10	–	3	–	0
Montana	5	–	2	–	0	7	–	3	–	0
Nevada	4	–	3	–	0	7	–	4	–	0
Weber State	4	–	3	–	0	7	–	4	–	0
Northern Arizona	2	–	5	–	0	4	–	7	–	0
Montana State	1	–	6	–	0	3	–	7	–	0
Idaho	0	–	7	–	0	3	–	8	–	0
$ – Conference champion; ^ – NCAA Division I-AA playoff participant; Rankings from NCAA Division I-AA Committee poll

The 1981 Idaho State Bengals football team represented Idaho State University in the Big Sky Conference during the 1981 NCAA Division I-AA football season. The Bengals were led by second-year head coach Dave Kragthorpe and played their home games at the ASISU Minidome (now Holt Arena), an indoor venue on campus in Pocatello, Idaho.

Quarterbacked by senior Mike Machurek, the Bengals won the Big Sky championship with a 6–1 record and were 9–1 overall in the regular season. The sole loss was at Montana, when Machurek remained in Pocatello with mononucleosis, and backup Dirk Koetter filled in; the Griz kicked a late field goal to win by three points in Missoula.

In the eight-team Division I-AA playoffs, Idaho State easily won two home playoff games, then secured their only national championship in the Pioneer Bowl at Wichita Falls, Texas. The Bengals defeated Eastern Kentucky 34–23 in the title game to finish with a 12–1 record, just two years removed from a winless season.

== Schedule ==
Date	Opponent	Rank	Site	TV	Result	Attendance	Source
September 12	Eastern Washington*		ASISU Minidome; Pocatello, ID		W 34–10	8,005	
September 19	at Boise State		Bronco Stadium; Boise, ID		W 21–10	20,486	
September 26	Nevada	No. 3	ASISU Minidome; Pocatello, ID		W 23–7	9,883	
October 3	Northern Arizona^{†}	No. 3	ASISU Minidome; Pocatello, ID		W 31–6	11,284	
October 10	at Portland State*	No. 2	Civic Stadium; Portland, OR		W 28–9	2,757	
October 17	at Montana	No. 2	Dornblaser Field; Missoula, MT		L 21–24	9,190	
October 31	at Idaho	No. 3	Kibbie Dome; Moscow, ID		W 24–14	10,500	
November 7	Montana State	No. 2	ASISU Minidome; Pocatello, ID		W 31–3	10,468	
November 14	Utah State*	No. 2	ASISU Minidome; Pocatello, ID		W 50–24	12,008	
November 21	Weber State	No. 2	ASISU Minidome; Pocatello, ID		W 33–30 ^{3OT}	13,444	
December 5	Rhode Island*	No. 2	ASISU Minidome; Pocatello, ID (NCAA Division I-AA Quarterfinal)		W 51–0	12,153	
December 12	No. 3 South Carolina State*	No. 2	ASISU Minidome; Pocatello, ID (NCAA Division I-AA Semifinal)		W 41–12	12,300	
December 19	vs. No. 1 Eastern Kentucky*	No. 2	Memorial Stadium; Wichita Falls, TX (NCAA Division I-AA Championship Game—Pioneer Bowl)	ABC	W 34–23	11,002	
*Non-conference game; ^{†}Homecoming; Rankings from AP Poll released prior to the game

- The regular season finale against Weber State went to triple overtime; the Big Sky introduced overtime for conference games the previous season, and this was its first-ever usage.

== Roster ==
1981 Idaho State Bengals football team roster
Players
Coaches
Offense

Pos.	#	Name	Class
LT		Dan Taylor	Jr
LG		Ken Noel	Sr
C		Jim Lane	Jr
RG		Ken Bacon	Jr
RT		Steve Anderson	Sr
TE		Rod Childs	Sr
QB	19	Mike Machurek	Sr
QB	12	Dirk Koetter	Sr
FB		Rick Ambrosi	Sr
TB		Dwaine Wilson	Sr
FL		Charles Ewing	Sr
SE		Jerry Bird	Sr

Defense

Pos.	#	Name	Class
LDT		Chuck Wiefels	Jr
NG		George Semons	Sr
RDT		John Naut	Sr
SOLB		John Olivia	Jr
SILB		Lem Galeai	Sr
WILB		Bill Snapp	Jr
WOLB		Dave Walser	Sr
LCB		Matt Courtney	So
SS		John Berry	So
FS		Reggie Chapman	Jr
RCB		Willie Allen	Jr

Special teams

Pos.	#	Name	Class
PK, P	3	Case deBruijn	Sr

Head coach

- Dave Kragthorpe (2nd year)

Coordinators/assistant coaches

- Jim Koetter – (QB, WR)
- Marvin Lewis – (LB)
- Mike Sheppard – (assistant)

Legend

- (C) Team captain
- (S) Suspended
- (I) Ineligible
- Injured
- Redshirt

== All-conference ==
Five Bengals were named to the all-conference team: quarterback Mike Machurek (unanimous), tight end Rod Childs, linebacker Dave Walser, defensive back Matt Courtney (sophomore), and punter Case de Bruijn. The second team included linebacker Lem Galei (sophomore) and de Bruijn at placekicker. Honorable mention were wide receivers Jerry Bird and Charles Ewing, tackle Steve Anderson, tailback Dwain Wilson, and linebacker Bill Snapp.

== NFL draft ==
Two Bengal seniors were selected in the 1982 NFL draft, which lasted 12 rounds with 334 selections.

Round	Pick	Player	Position	NFL club
6	154	Mike Machurek	Quarterback	Detroit Lions
8	214	Case deBruijn	Punter/Kicker	Kansas City Chiefs
