= 1981 Montana Grizzlies football team =

American college football season

1981 Montana Grizzlies football
- Conference: Big Sky Conference
- Record: 7–3 (5–2 Big Sky)
- Head coach: Larry Donovan (2nd season)
- Home stadium: Dornblaser Field

1981 Big Sky Conference football standings
	Conf.					Overall
Team	W		L		T	W		L		T
No. 2 Idaho State $^	6	–	1	–	0	12	–	1	–	0
No. 5 Boise State ^	6	–	1	–	0	10	–	3	–	0
Montana	5	–	2	–	0	7	–	3	–	0
Nevada	4	–	3	–	0	7	–	4	–	0
Weber State	4	–	3	–	0	7	–	4	–	0
Northern Arizona	2	–	5	–	0	4	–	7	–	0
Montana State	1	–	6	–	0	3	–	7	–	0
Idaho	0	–	7	–	0	3	–	8	–	0
$ – Conference champion; ^ – NCAA Division I-AA playoff participant; Rankings from NCAA Division I-AA Committee poll

The 1981 Montana Grizzlies football team represented the University of Montana in the 1981 NCAA Division I-AA football season. A charter member of the Big Sky Conference, the Grizzlies were led by second-year head coach Larry Donovan and played their home games at Dornblaser Field in Missoula.

Montana had an overall record of 7–3 and finished third in the Big Sky at 5–2.

Montana was the only team to defeat Idaho State in 1981; a tie-breaking field goal with seconds remaining was the difference. The Bengals went on to win the conference title and the Division I-AA championship.

== Schedule ==
Date	Opponent	Rank	Site	Result	Attendance	Source
September 19	at Northern Arizona		Walkup Skydome; Flagstaff, AZ	W 29–23	11,500	
September 26	Northern Iowa*		Dornblaser Field; Missoula, MT	W 42–21	8,281	
October 3	No. T–9 Boise State		Dornblaser Field; Missoula, MT	L 13–27	8,732	
October 10	at Idaho		Kibbie Dome; Moscow, ID (Little Brown Stein)	W 16–14	11,000	
October 17	No. 2 Idaho State		Dornblaser Field; Missoula, MT	W 24–21	9,190	
October 24	Portland State*		Dornblaser Field; Missoula, MT	W 33–3	8,517	
October 31	at Montana State	No. 10	Reno H. Sales Stadium; Bozeman, MT (rivalry)	W 27–17	14,000	
November 7	Nevada	No. 9	Dornblaser Field; Missoula, MT	W 33–26	7,900	
November 14	Weber State	No. 9	Dornblaser Field; Missoula, MT	L 6–7	9,000	
November 21	at Eastern Washington*		Joe Albi Stadium; Spokane, WA (rivalry)	L 13–14	1,500	
*Non-conference game; Rankings from NCAA Division I-AA Football Committee Poll released prior to the game

== Roster ==
1981 Montana Grizzlies football team roster
Players
Coaches
Offense

Pos.	#	Name	Class
WR	81	Mike Alex	Sr
FB	34	Mike Hagen	Sr
RB	15	Rocky Klever	Sr
QB	11	Marty Mornhinweg	So

Defense

Pos.	#	Name	Class
DL	87	Pat Curry	Sr
DB	16	Scott Ellig	Jr
LB	7	Joe Nuu	Jr
CB	20	Mickey Sutton	Sr

Special teams

Pos.	#	Name	Class

Head coach

- Larry Donovan

Coordinators/assistant coaches

Legend

- (C) Team captain
- (S) Suspended
- (I) Ineligible
- Injured
- Redshirt
