= 1981 Boise State Broncos football team =

American college football season

1981 Boise State Broncos football
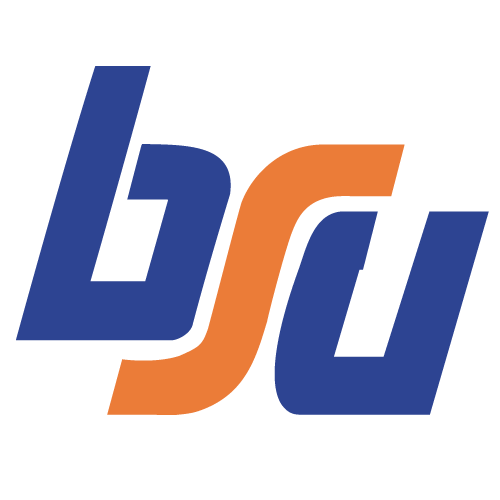

NCAA Division I-AA Semifinal, L 17–23 vs. Eastern Kentucky
- Conference: Big Sky Conference

Ranking
- AP: No. 5
- Record: 10–3 (6–1 Big Sky)
- Head coach: Jim Criner (6th season)
- Offensive coordinator: Gene Dahlquist (5th season)
- Defensive coordinator: Lyle Setencich (2nd season)
- Base defense: 3–4
- Home stadium: Bronco Stadium

1981 Big Sky Conference football standings
| | Conf. | | | | | Overall |
| Team | W | | L | | T | W | | L | | T |
|---|---|---|---|---|---|---|---|---|---|---|
| No. 2 Idaho State $^ | 6 | – | 1 | – | 0 | 12 | – | 1 | – | 0 |
| No. 5 Boise State ^ | 6 | – | 1 | – | 0 | 10 | – | 3 | – | 0 |
| Montana | 5 | – | 2 | – | 0 | 7 | – | 3 | – | 0 |
| Nevada | 4 | – | 3 | – | 0 | 7 | – | 4 | – | 0 |
| Weber State | 4 | – | 3 | – | 0 | 7 | – | 4 | – | 0 |
| Northern Arizona | 2 | – | 5 | – | 0 | 4 | – | 7 | – | 0 |
| Montana State | 1 | – | 6 | – | 0 | 3 | – | 7 | – | 0 |
| Idaho | 0 | – | 7 | – | 0 | 3 | – | 8 | – | 0 |
$ – Conference champion; ^ – NCAA Division I-AA playoff participant; Rankings from NCAA Division I-AA Committee poll

The 1981 Boise State Broncos football team represented Boise State University in the 1981 NCAA Division I-AA football season. The Broncos competed in the Big Sky Conference and played their home games at Bronco Stadium, an outdoor facility on campus in Boise, Idaho. The Broncos were led by sixth-year head coach Jim Criner and were the defending champions of Division I-AA.

== Regular season ==
The Broncos finished the regular season at 9–2 and 6–1 in conference to tie for first in the Big Sky, but lost the tiebreaker due to the head-to-head loss to champion Idaho State in the conference opener. The Broncos avenged their 1980 loss Cal Poly-SLO, beating the 1980 Division II national champions 17–6 in Boise, but lost at Cal State Fullerton, whom they defeated in Boise in the previous season. The Broncos narrowly defeated rival Idaho for the fifth consecutive year, in the regular season finale in Moscow. The Vandals were winless in the Big Sky in 1981, which caused a change in head coaches. (BSU did not defeat the Vandals again until 1994, losing twelve straight).

== Division I-AA playoffs ==
The Broncos were again invited to the Division I-AA playoffs, expanded to eight teams for 1981. As Big Sky runner-up, BSU played on the road in the quarterfinals at Jackson State, and won 19–7. The semifinal game was played at home against top-ranked Eastern Kentucky, whom the Broncos had narrowly defeated in the title game the year before. This time the Colonels prevailed 23–17, but lost the title game to Idaho State the following week in Texas.

The Broncos returned to the I-AA playoffs in 1988, the semifinals in 1990, and the title game in 1994, then moved up to Division I-A in 1996.

== Schedule ==
| Date | Time | Opponent | Rank | Site | Result | Attendance | Source |
|---|---|---|---|---|---|---|---|
| September 5 | 7:00 pm | Northwestern State* | | Bronco Stadium; Boise, ID | W 32–20 | 19,347 | |
| September 12 | 7:00 pm | Rhode Island* | | Bronco Stadium; Boise, ID | W 33–8 | 19,437 | |
| September 19 | 7:00 pm | Idaho State | | Bronco Stadium; Boise, ID | L 10–21 | 20,486 | |
| September 26 | 7:00 pm | Northern Arizona | No. 10 | Bronco Stadium; Boise, ID | W 34–20 | 17,622 | |
| October 3 | | at Montana | No. 9 | Dornblaser Field; Missoula, MT | W 27–13 | 8,732 | |
| October 10 | 7:00 pm | Montana State^{†} | No. 7 | Bronco Stadium; Boise, ID | W 20–10 | 18,842 | |
| October 24 | 1:30 pm | at Weber State | No. 6 | Wildcat Stadium; Ogden, UT | W 33–19 | 12,306 | |
| October 31 | 1:00 pm | at Nevada | No. 4 | Mackay Stadium; Reno, NV (rivalry) | W 13–3 | 14,325 | |
| November 7 | 1:30 pm | at Cal State Fullerton* | No. 3 | Titan Field; Fullerton, CA | L 17–20 | 2,100 | |
| November 14 | 1:30 pm | Cal Poly* | No. 6 | Bronco Stadium; Boise, ID | W 17–6 | 17,260 | |
| November 21 | 8:30 pm | at Idaho | No. 4 | Kibbie Dome; Moscow, ID (rivalry) | W 45–43 | 14,000 | |
| December 5 | 12:30 pm | at No. 4 Jackson State* | No. 5 | Veterans Memorial Stadium; Jackson, MS (Div. I-AA Quarterfinal) | W 17–6 | 11,500 | |
| December 12 | 11:30 am | No. 1 Eastern Kentucky* | No. 5 | Bronco Stadium; Boise, ID (Div. I-AA Semifinal) | L 17–23 | 20,176 | |
*Non-conference game; ^{†}Homecoming; Rankings from NCAA Division I-AA Football Committee Poll released prior to the game; All times are in Mountain time

== Personnel ==
=== Coaches ===
Head coach Jim Criner stayed seven seasons at Boise State before departing for Iowa State following the 1982 season. Defensive coordinator Lyle Setencich was promoted to head coach and led Boise State for four seasons, from 1983 to 1986. The defensive secondary coach in 1981 was future National Football League (NFL) head coach John Fox.

=== Notable players ===
Future NFL players included linebacker John Rade and safety Rick Woods. Defensive lineman Randy Trautman played four seasons in the Canadian Football League (CFL) and was inducted into the College Football Hall of Fame in 1999.

=== Roster ===
1981 Boise State Broncos football team roster
Players
Coaches
Offense

| Pos. | # | Name | Class |
|---|---|---|---|
| FL | 1 | Ron Harvey | Jr |
| QB | 13 | Gerald DesPres | Fr |
| QB | 18 | Tim Klena | So |
| TB | 34 | Rodney Webster | So |
| FB | 36 | Robert Farmer | Jr |
| C | 53 | Scott Baker | So |
| LT | 60 | Dennis Brady | Sr |
| RT | 67 | Bill Madinger | Sr |
| LG | 68 | Greg Sutton | So |
| RG | 71 | Jon Zogg | Jr |
| SE | 80 | Kipp Bedard | Sr |
| TE | 90 | Duane Dlouhy | Sr |

Defense

| Pos. | # | Name | Class |
|---|---|---|---|
| FS | 26 | David Blackburn | Jr |
| CB | 28 | Chris Bell | Sr |
| SS | 29 | Rick Woods | Sr |
| LOLB | 32 | Dan LeBeau | Sr |
| CB | 37 | Bobby Fryer | Jr |
| FS | 42 | Larry Alder | Jr |
| NG | 43 | Bob Skinner | Jr |
| RILB | 44 | Curt Hecker | Jr |
| ROLB | 58 | John Rade | Jr |
| LILB | 61 | Ray Santucci | Sr |
| LDT | 70 | Randy Trautman | Sr |
| RDT | 75 | Eric McCree | Jr |

Special teams

| Pos. | # | Name | Class |
|---|---|---|---|
| KR | 5 | John Broadous | Jr |
| K | 10 | Kenrick Camerud | Jr |
| PR | 29 | Rick Woods | Sr |
| P | 33 | Eric Brown | Fr |
| LS | 66 | Jeff Caves | So |

Head coach

- Jim Criner (6th year)

Coordinators/assistant coaches

- Gene Dahlquist (OC)
- Lyle Setencich (DC)
- Bill Dutton (DL)
- John Fox (DB)

Legend

- (C) Team captain
- (S) Suspended
- (I) Ineligible
- Injured
- Redshirt

== NFL draft ==
Two Bronco seniors were selected in the 1982 NFL draft, which lasted 12 rounds (334 selections).

| Player | Position | Round | Overall | Franchise |
| Rick Woods | DB | 4th | 97 | Pittsburgh Steelers |
| Randy Trautman | DT | 9th | 238 | Washington Redskins |
