= 1977 Northern Arizona Lumberjacks football team =

American college football season

1977 Northern Arizona Lumberjacks football

NCAA Division II First Round, L 0–34 vs. Jacksonville State
- Conference: Big Sky Conference
- Record: 9–3 (5–1 Big Sky)
- Head coach: Joe Salem (3rd season)
- Home stadium: Lumberjack Stadium, NAU Ensphere

1977 Big Sky Conference football standings
	Conf.					Overall
Team	W		L		T	W		L		T
No. T–5 Boise State $	6	–	0	–	0	9	–	2	–	0
No. T–5 Northern Arizona ^	5	–	1	–	0	9	–	3	–	0
Montana State	3	–	3	–	0	6	–	4	–	0
Weber State	2	–	4	–	0	4	–	6	–	0
Idaho State	2	–	4	–	0	3	–	8	–	0
Idaho	2	–	4	–	0	3	–	8	–	0
Montana	1	–	5	–	0	4	–	6	–	0
$ – Conference champion; ^ – NCAA Division II playoff participant; Boise State concluded its regular season after the NCAA Division II playoffs started; runner-up Northern Arizona was awarded playoff bid.; Rankings from NCAA Division II AP Poll

The 1977 Northern Arizona Lumberjacks football team was an American football team that represented Northern Arizona University (NAU) as a member of the Big Sky Conference (Big Sky) during the 1977 NCAA Division II football season. In their third year under head coach Joe Salem, the Lumberjacks compiled a 9–3 record (5–1 against conference opponents), outscored opponents by a total of 324 to 204, and finished second out of seven teams in the Big Sky.

The team played its season and home opener on September 3 at Lumberjack Stadium before moving to the newly-constructed NAU Ensphere, later renamed the Walkup Skydome, in Flagstaff, Arizona. The first game in the new stadium was played on September 17 against Montana.

The Lumberjacks earned a berth in the 1977 NCAA Division II Playoffs, losing in the first round to Jacksonville State.

== Schedule ==
Date	Opponent	Rank	Site	Result	Attendance	Source
September 3	Augustana (SD)*		Lumberjack Stadium; Flagstaff, AZ	W 31–30	8,250	
September 10	at Idaho State		ASISU Minidome; Pocatello, ID	W 28–7	7,200	
September 17	Montana		NAU Ensphere; Flagstaff, AZ	W 25–24	12,860	
September 24	at Weber State		Wildcat Stadium; Ogden, UT	W 36–10	10,014	
October 1	at UNLV*	No. 8	Las Vegas Silver Bowl; Whitney, NV	L 16–20	13,397–13,497	
October 8	at Cal Poly Pomona*		Kellogg Field; Pomona, CA	W 16–0	2,500	
October 15	Cal State Fullerton		NAU Ensphere; Flagstaff, AZ	W 24–9	15,988	
October 22	at Boise State		Bronco Stadium; Boise, ID	L 13–27	20,448	
November 5	Montana State		NAU Ensphere; Flagstaff, AZ	W 28–21	14,216	
November 12	Eastern Montana*	No. T–10	NAU Ensphere; Flagstaff, AZ	W 70–0	10,244	
November 19	Nebraska–Omaha*	No. T–5	NAU Ensphere; Flagstaff, AZ	W 37–21	11,838	
November 26	No. 9 Jacksonville State*	No. T–5	NAU Ensphere; Flagstaff, AZ (NCAA Division II First Round)	L 0–35	7,500	
*Non-conference game; Rankings from AP Poll released prior to the game

Northern Arizona did not play Idaho, so a non-conference game was designated to count in the standings for each team. Both were home games against Pacific Coast Athletic Association (PCAA) opponents; Idaho lost to Pacific, while NAU defeated Cal State Fullerton.
