= 1977 Idaho Vandals football team =

American college football season

1977 Idaho Vandals football
- Conference: Big Sky Conference
- Record: 3–8 (2–4 Big Sky)
- Head coach: Ed Troxel (4th season)
- Offensive coordinator: John McMahon (2nd season)
- Offensive scheme: Veer
- Defensive coordinator: Greg McMackin (1st season)
- Base defense: 4–3
- Captains: Craig Juntunen; Chris Tormey
- Home stadium: Idaho Stadium

1977 Big Sky Conference football standings
	Conf.					Overall
Team	W		L		T	W		L		T
No. T–5 Boise State $	6	–	0	–	0	9	–	2	–	0
No. T–5 Northern Arizona ^	5	–	1	–	0	9	–	3	–	0
Montana State	3	–	3	–	0	6	–	4	–	0
Weber State	2	–	4	–	0	4	–	6	–	0
Idaho State	2	–	4	–	0	3	–	8	–	0
Idaho	2	–	4	–	0	3	–	8	–	0
Montana	1	–	5	–	0	4	–	6	–	0
$ – Conference champion; ^ – NCAA Division II playoff participant; Boise State concluded its regular season after the NCAA Division II playoffs started; runner-up Northern Arizona was awarded playoff bid.; Rankings from NCAA Division II AP Poll

The 1977 Idaho Vandals football team represented the University of Idaho in the 1977 NCAA Division I football season. The Vandals were led by fourth-year head coach Ed Troxel and were members of the Big Sky Conference, then in Division II for football. They played their home games at the Kibbie Dome, an indoor facility on campus in Moscow, Idaho.

== Season ==
With quarterbacks Craig Juntunen and Rocky Tuttle running the veer offense, the Vandals were 3–8 overall and 2–4 in the Big Sky in 1977. Idaho did not play runner-up Northern Arizona, but the Big Sky designated a non-conference home game for each to count as a sixth conference game in the standings, with both opponents from the PCAA. The Vandals lost to Pacific in September while NAU defeated Cal State Fullerton in October.

The Vandals suffered a tenth straight loss in the Battle of the Palouse with neighbor Washington State of the Pac-8, falling 45–17 at Martin Stadium in Pullman on November 12.

=== Boise State ===
The season concluded with a 30-point home loss to Boise State, held two days after Thanksgiving. The young rivalry took a new step in the fourth quarter, when the Broncos were up 34–14 and in control. Having thrown the ball sparingly in building its twenty-point lead, second-year head coach Jim Criner went heavily to the passing game. Boise scored a touchdown with less than two minutes left, then staged a successful onside kick and made a field goal with seconds remaining.

Boise State went undefeated in the Big Sky, but because of the late conclusion of their regular season, they had to decline a berth in the Division II playoffs, which started earlier that day. Conference runner-up Northern Arizona took their place and was shut out at home, 35–0. In the previous season, underdog Idaho had won the rivalry game in the season opener before a record crowd in Boise in Criner's debut as head coach. At the time, the Broncos were three-time defending conference champions, all under previous head coach Tony Knap. Idaho had agreed to move that 1976 game from November 27 up to September 11, so that BSU could participate in the D-II playoffs, but the Broncos ended at 2–5 in the Big Sky (fifth) and 5–5–1 overall.

== Division I ==
This was the last season prior to the creation of Division I-AA, which the Big Sky joined. Through 1977, the Big Sky was a Division II conference for football, except for Division I member Idaho, which moved down to I-AA in 1978. Idaho had maintained its upper division status in the NCAA by playing Division I non-conference opponents (and was ineligible for the Division II postseason). (Idaho was involuntarily dropped to the College Division in 1967, then returned to the University Division in 1969.)

== Troxel fired ==
Five weeks after the season concluded, Troxel was asked for his resignation by new university president Richard Gibb on December 30. An assistant under the preceding three head coaches and a former head coach of track and field, he had been at UI for an over a decade. Very successful at Borah High School in Boise (1958–66), Troxel returned to the high school ranks in 1978 at Kennewick High School, in the Tri-Cities of eastern Washington, and built the Lions into winners; he coached through 1990, and died of cancer at age 75 in 2001.

== Schedule ==
Date	Time	Opponent	Site	Result	Attendance	Source
September 10	5:30 pm	at Rice*	Rice Stadium; Houston, TX	L 10–31	14,000	
September 17	8:00 pm	Pacific (CA)	Kibbie Dome; Moscow, ID	L 21–31	12,000	
September 24	10:00 pm	at Hawaii*	Aloha Stadium; Halawa, HI	L 26–45	25,463	
October 8	8:00 pm	Idaho State	Kibbie Dome; Moscow, ID	L 14–34	11,500	
October 15	1:30 pm	Montana^{†}	Kibbie Dome; Moscow, ID (Little Brown Stein)	W 31–20	15,200	
October 22	12:30 pm	at No. 3 Montana State	Reno H. Sales Stadium; Bozeman, MT	W 17–6	8,750	
October 29	12:30 pm	at Weber State	Wildcat Stadium; Ogden, UT	L 27–30	3,000	
November 5	7:30 pm	UNLV*	Kibbie Dome; Moscow, ID	L 21–35	7,400	
November 12	1:00 pm	at Washington State*	Martin Stadium; Pullman, WA (Battle of the Palouse)	L 17–45	18,500	
November 19	6:00 pm	at New Mexico State*	Memorial Stadium; Las Cruces, NM	W 47–44	6,438	
November 26	7:30 pm	No. T–5 Boise State	Kibbie Dome; Moscow, ID (rivalry)	L 14–44	12,000	
*Non-conference game; ^{†}Homecoming; Rankings from AP Poll released prior to the game; All times are in Pacific time

Idaho did not play Northern Arizona, so a non-conference game was designated to count in the standings for each team. Both were home games against Pacific Coast Athletic Association (PCAA) opponents. Idaho lost to Pacific, while Northern Arizona defeated Cal State Fullerton.

== Roster ==
1977 Idaho Vandals football team roster
Players
Coaches
Offense

Pos.	#	Name	Class
QB	7	Mike McCurdy	Fr
SE	10	Brad Clausen
SE	11	Jett Taylor	Jr
QB, P	12	Rocky Tuttle	Jr
QB	14	Craig Juntunen (C)	Sr
QB	15	Jay Goodenbour	Fr
SE	18	Kirk Allen	Jr
RB	25	Robert Brooks (injured)	Sr
RB	30	Tim Lappano	Jr
TE	33	Mike Supkis	So
RB	35	Glenn Ford	So
RB	36	Glen White	Fr
RB	40	Robert Taylor	Sr
TE	44	Dan Meyer	So
C	50	Joe Kramer	Sr
C	53	Dave Pearson	Jr
OL	55	David Earl
OL	59	Mike Clark	Jr
RG	61	Dick Wilkin	Jr
OL	63	Bob Volke	Fr
OL	64	Mark Whipps	Jr
RG	65	Joe Dahlin	Sr
OL	66	Doug Gisselberg	So
OL	68	Brian Zimmerman	Jr
LT	69	Larry Coombs	So
OL	71	Mark McNeal	So
LG	74	Dave Wiggum	Sr
RT	77	Tom Randel	Jr
FL	80	Dan Davidson	Sr
TE	84	Rick Mayfield	Jr
TE	87	Jeff Eucker

Defense

Pos.	#	Name	Class
DB	20	Larry Barker	Fr
DB	21	Mike Keogh	Fr
DB	22	Ray McCanna	Fr
DB	23	Marc Watts	Fr
FS	24	Rick Linehan	Jr
CB	26	Greg Coman	Sr
DB	27	Todd McKillop	Jr
LB	33	Kelly Grimes	So
LB	34	Chris Frost	Sr
DB	37	Dan Duncan	So
DB	41	Doug Moy	Sr
CB	42	Bill Clark	Sr
CB	43	Brian Charles	Sr
DB	45	Kevin Johnson
LB	45	Monty Elder	Fr
LB	51	Chris Eads	So
LB	52	Bob Cafferty	Jr
LB	54	Tom Jacksha	Sr
LB	57	Marty Marshall	So
LB	58	Dan Cozzetto	Jr
DL	60	Mark Stennfeld	Jr
DT	62	Tim Sanford	Sr
DL	67	Scott Whipps	Jr
DL	70	Kyle Riddell	So
DT	72	Joe Pellegrini	Sr
DE	73	Tom Eilertson	Sr
DT	75	Lynn Rice	Sr
DL	76	Vic Lillquist	So
DT	78	Steve Parker	So
DL	79	Mark Husby
LB	81	Rick Hunt	So
DL	82	Randy Ralph	So
LB	83	Phil Vance	So
LB	85	Chris Tormey (C)	Sr
DL	86	Tom Michaud	Fr
DE	89	Robert Collins	Jr

Special teams

Pos.	#	Name	Class
PK, P	6	Ralph Lowe	Sr

Head coach

- Ed Troxel

Coordinators/assistant coaches

- John McMahon (OC)
- Greg McMackin (DC)

Legend

- (C) Team captain
- (S) Suspended
- (I) Ineligible
- Injured
- Redshirt

== All-conference ==
Defensive tackle Tim Sanford and punter Ralph Lowe were named to the Big Sky all-conference team; Lowe was named to the second team as a placekicker. Also on the second team were tackle Larry Coombs, center Joe Kramer, running back Robert Taylor, linebacker Chris Tormey, defensive end Joe Pellegrini, and defensive back Brian Charles.
