= 1976 Northern Arizona Lumberjacks football team =

American college football season

1976 Northern Arizona Lumberjacks football
- Conference: Big Sky Conference
- Record: 8–3 (4–2 Big Sky)
- Head coach: Joe Salem (2nd season)
- Home stadium: Lumberjack Stadium

1976 Big Sky Conference football standings
	Conf.					Overall
Team	W		L		T	W		L		T
No. 1 Montana State $^	6	–	0	–	0	12	–	1	–	0
Idaho	5	–	1	–	0	7	–	4	–	0
Northern Arizona	4	–	2	–	0	8	–	3	–	0
Montana	3	–	3	–	0	4	–	6	–	0
Boise State	2	–	4	–	0	5	–	5	–	1
Weber State	1	–	5	–	0	2	–	9	–	0
Idaho State	0	–	6	–	0	1	–	9	–	0
$ – Conference champion; ^ – NCAA Division II playoff participant; Rankings from NCAA Division II AP Poll

The 1976 Northern Arizona Lumberjacks football team was an American football team that represented Northern Arizona University (NAU) as a member of the Big Sky Conference (Big Sky) during the 1975 NCAA Division II football season. In their second year under head coach Joe Salem, the Lumberjacks compiled an 8–3 record (4–2 against conference opponents), outscored opponents by a total of 249 to 184, and finished third out of seven teams in the Big Sky.

The team's statistical leaders included Herb Daniel with 1,314 passing yards, Carl Golden with 731 rushing yards, Tyrone Peterson with 519 receiving yards, Tom Jurich with 45 points scored, and Jerry Lumpkin with 135 tackles.

The team played its home games at Lumberjack Stadium in Flagstaff, Arizona.

== Schedule ==
Date	Opponent	Rank	Site	Result	Attendance	Source
September 4	United States International		Lumberjack Stadium; Flagstaff, AZ	W 20–0	6,500	
September 11	Idaho State		Lumberjack Stadium; Flagstaff, AZ	W 34–7	8,364	
September 25	at Nebraska–Omaha*		Al F. Caniglia Field; Omaha, NE	W 28–13	4,500	
October 9	at Montana		Dornblaser Field; Missoula, MT	W 23–21	9,607	
October 16	Cal Poly Pomona*^{†}		Lumberjack Stadium; Flagstaff, AZ	L 7–9	12,800	
October 23	No T–5 UNLV*		Lumberjack Stadium; Flagstaff, AZ	W 31–28	6,860	
October 30	Boise State	No. 10	Lumberjack Stadium; Flagstaff, AZ	W 42–7	9,060	
November 6	at No. 3 Montana State	No. 6	Sales Stadium; Bozeman, MT	L 0–33	9,400	
November 13	Weber State		Lumberjack Stadium; Flagstaff, AZ	W 30–18	6,150	
November 20	at Idaho		Kibbie Dome; Moscow, ID	L 14–31	10,166	
November 27	at Cal State Fullerton*		Falcon Stadium; Norwalk, CA	W 20–17	2,100	
*Non-conference game; ^{†}Homecoming; Rankings from AP Poll released prior to the game
