= 1976 Idaho Vandals football team =

American college football season

1976 Idaho Vandals football
- Conference: Big Sky Conference
- Record: 7–4 (5–1 Big Sky)
- Head coach: Ed Troxel (3rd season)
- Offensive coordinator: John McMahon (1st season)
- Offensive scheme: Veer
- Defensive coordinator: A. J. Christoff (3rd season)
- Base defense: 5–2
- Captains: Barry Hopkins; John Kirtland; Wil Overgaard
- Home stadium: Idaho Stadium

1976 Big Sky Conference football standings
	Conf.					Overall
Team	W		L		T	W		L		T
No. 1 Montana State $^	6	–	0	–	0	12	–	1	–	0
Idaho	5	–	1	–	0	7	–	4	–	0
Northern Arizona	4	–	2	–	0	8	–	3	–	0
Montana	3	–	3	–	0	4	–	6	–	0
Boise State	2	–	4	–	0	5	–	5	–	1
Weber State	1	–	5	–	0	2	–	9	–	0
Idaho State	0	–	6	–	0	1	–	9	–	0
$ – Conference champion; ^ – NCAA Division II playoff participant; Rankings from NCAA Division II AP Poll

The 1976 Idaho Vandals football team represented the University of Idaho in the 1976 NCAA Division I football season. The Vandals were led by third-year head coach Ed Troxel and were members of the Big Sky Conference, then in Division II for football. They played their home games at the Kibbie Dome, an indoor facility on campus in Moscow, Idaho.

== Season ==
With quarterbacks Rocky Tuttle and Craig Juntunen running the veer offense, the Vandals were 7–4 overall and 5–1 in the Big Sky. The only conference loss was to Montana State in Bozeman; the Bobcats went undefeated in the Big Sky and won the Division II national championship.

The season opened with a road win over Boise State, the three-time defending conference champions, in the debut of Jim Criner as head coach of the Broncos. Originally scheduled for November 27, it was moved to the opener at BSU's request, so as not to interfere with the Division II playoffs. In the Battle of the Palouse, the Vandals suffered a ninth straight loss to neighbor Washington State of the Pac-8, falling 45–6 at Martin Stadium in Pullman on October 2. The Cougars were led by quarterback Jack Thompson and fullback Dan Doornink.

Outside of the 1971 season (8–3), the Vandals' 7–4 record in 1976 was the best since 1938 (6–3–1). It was Troxel's only winning season as head coach; Idaho slipped to 3–8 in 1977 and he was fired in late December.

== Notable players ==
Center John Yarno of Spokane was selected to the AP All-American team, which included a prime-time appearance on Bob Hope's Christmas show on NBC on Monday, December 13. The All-America team was headlined by Heisman Trophy winner Tony Dorsett of Pittsburgh. Yarno was also selected to play in the East–West Shrine Game and the Senior Bowl. His number 56 was retired the following year. Selected in the fourth round of the 1977 NFL draft, he played six seasons with the Seattle Seahawks, the last five as a starter.

Future actor Bill Fagerbakke of Rupert was a sophomore defensive lineman and was ticketed to redshirt, but was called into action in the fourth game. Head coach Troxel planned on moving him to the offensive line in 1977, but a knee injury in spring drills ended Fagerbakke's athletic career, which turned his focus to theater.

== Division I ==
Through 1977, the Big Sky was a Division II conference for football, except for Division I member Idaho, which moved down to I-AA in 1978. Idaho maintained its upper division status in the NCAA by playing Division I non-conference opponents (and was ineligible for the Division II postseason).

== Schedule ==
Date	Time	Opponent	Site	Result	Attendance	Source
September 11	6:30 pm	at Boise State	Bronco Stadium; Boise, ID (rivalry)	W 16–9	20,549	
September 18	7:30 pm	at Pacific (CA)*	Pacific Memorial Stadium; Stockton, CA	W 31–28	11,769	
September 25	11:30 am	at Ohio*	Peden Stadium; Athens, OH	L 0–35	13,710	
October 2	1:30 pm	at Washington State*	Martin Stadium; Pullman, WA (Battle of the Palouse)	L 6–45	20,000	
October 9	8:00 pm	New Mexico State*	Kibbie Dome; Moscow, ID	W 33–6	10,166	
October 16	8:00 pm	Weber State^{†}	Kibbie Dome; Moscow, ID	W 45–17	15,607	
October 23	12:30 pm	at No. 7 Montana State	Reno H. Sales Stadium; Bozeman, MT	L 14–29	5,400	
October 30	7:00 pm	at Idaho State	ASISU Minidome; Pocatello, ID (rivalry)	W 6–3	9,625	
November 6	12:00 pm	at Colorado State*	Hughes Stadium; Fort Collins, CO	L 14–31	17,536	
November 13	8:00 pm	Montana	Kibbie Dome; Moscow, ID (rivalry)	W 28–19	9,396	
November 20	8:00 pm	Northern Arizona	Kibbie Dome; Moscow, ID	W 31–14	7,160	
*Non-conference game; ^{†}Homecoming; Rankings from AP Poll released prior to the game; All times are in Pacific time

== Roster ==
1976 Idaho Vandals football team roster
Players
Coaches
Offense

Pos.	#	Name	Class
SE	6	Ron Loveall
SE	11	Jett Taylor
QB	12	Rocky Tuttle	So
QB	14	Craig Juntunen	Jr
SE	18	Kirk Allen	So
SE, P	21	Paul Cox	Sr
SE	23	Dave Imelio
RB	25	Robert Brooks	Jr
RB	30	Tim Lappano	So
RB	31	Lance Hubbard
SE	34	Nick Pothetes
RB	35	Glenn Ford
RB	40	Robert Taylor	Jr
TE	44	Dan Meyer
FB	45	Kevin McAfee	Sr
C	50	Mike Clark
C	53	Dave Pearson
C	56	John Yarno	Sr
RG	61	Dick Wilkin
OL	64	Doug Gisselberg
LG	65	Joe Dahlin	Jr
OL	66	Peter Koch
RG	68	Clarence Hough	Sr
OL	69	Larry Coombs	Fr
OL	71	Mark McNeal	Fr
LG	74	Dave Wiggum	Jr
RT	76	Greg Kittrell	Sr
OL	77	Tom Randel	So
LT	78	Wil Overgaard (C)	Sr
SE	80	Dan Davidson
TE	84	Rick Mayfield	So
FL	88	Mike Hagadone	So

Defense

Pos.	#	Name	Class
DB	20	Dan Dangerfield
DB	22	Ron O'Bard
FS	24	Rick Linehan	So
CB	26	Greg Coman	Jr
DB	33	Chris Frost
DB	36	Greg Stewart
SS	37	Barry Hopkins (C)	Sr
DB	38	Eric Simmon
DB	41	Doug May
CB	42	Bill Clark	Jr
CB	43	Brian Charles	Jr
LB	47	Tom Jacksha
DE	51	Chris Eads	Fr
LB	52	Bob Cafferty	So
LB	54	Tom Kelleher
DE	55	Jeff Phister	Sr
LB	57	Marty Marshall
LB	58	Kjel Kiilsgaard	Sr
LB	59	John Kirtland (C)	Sr
NG	62	Tim Sanford	Jr
DL	63	Scott Whipps
DL	67	Mike Shelby
DL	70	Pat Collins
DL	72	Pat Hayes
DT	72	Joe Pellegrini	Jr
NG, DT	73	Tom Eilertson	Jr
DT	75	Lynn Rice
DL	79	Bill Fagerbakke	So
LB	81	Rich Hunt
DL	82	Randy Ralph
DL	83	Phil Vance	Fr
DE	85	Chris Tormey	Jr
DL	86	Jeff Mooney
DL	89	Robert Collins

Special teams

Pos.	#	Name	Class
PK	7	Chuck Filippini	Sr
PK, P	10	Ralph Lowe	Jr

Head coach

- Ed Troxel

Coordinators/assistant coaches

- John McMahon (OC)
- Andy Christoff (DC)

Legend

- (C) Team captain
- (S) Suspended
- (I) Ineligible
- Injured
- Redshirt

== All-conference ==
Senior center John Yarno was the Big Sky offensive player of the year and one of six Vandals selected to the all-conference team. The other three on offense were running back Robert Brooks, guard Clarence Hough, and tackle Wil Overgaard. The two defensive players were linebacker Kjel Kiilsgaard and end Chris Tormey, a future Vandal head coach (1995–99). Second team selections were tackle Greg Kittrell, noseguard Tim Sanford, and linebacker John Kirtland.

== NFL draft ==
One Vandal was selected in the 1977 NFL draft, which lasted 12 rounds (335 selections).

Player	Position	Round	Overall	Franchise
John Yarno	Center	4th	87	Seattle Seahawks
