= 1976 San Francisco State Gators football team =

American college football season

1976 San Francisco State Gators football
- Conference: Far Western Conference
- Record: 4–7 (2–3 FWC)
- Head coach: Vic Rowen (16th season)
- Home stadium: Cox Stadium

1976 Far Western Conference football standings
	Conf.					Overall
Team	W		L		T	W		L		T
UC Davis $	5	–	0	–	0	8	–	2	–	0
Humboldt State	4	–	1	–	0	5	–	5	–	0
Chico State	2	–	3	–	0	5	–	6	–	0
San Francisco State	2	–	3	–	0	4	–	7	–	0
Sacramento State	2	–	3	–	0	2	–	8	–	0
Cal State Hayward	0	–	5	–	0	1	–	8	–	1
$ – Conference champion

The 1976 San Francisco State Gators football team represented San Francisco State University as a member of the Far Western Conference (FWC) during the 1976 NCAA Division II football season. Led by 16th-year head coach Vic Rowen, San Francisco State compiled an overall record of 4–7 with a mark of 2–3 in conference play, placing in a three-way tie for third place in the FWC. For the season the team was outscored by its opponents 179 to 130. The Gators played home games at Cox Stadium in San Francisco.

== Schedule ==
Date	Opponent	Site	Result	Attendance	Source
September 10	Cal State Northridge*	Cox Stadium; San Francisco, CA	L 9–14	1,200	
September 18	at Oregon Tech*	Klamath Falls, OR	W 20–0	800	
September 25	at Cal Poly Pomona*	Kellogg Field; Pomona, CA	W 22–19	2,500	
October 1	Cal State Los Angeles*	Campus Field; Los Angeles, CA	L 0–10	750–1,000	
October 9	at Cal State Fullerton*	Falcon Stadium; Norwalk, CA	L 13–31	3,161–3,400	
October 15	Chico State	Cox Stadium; San Francisco, CA	L 10–16	500–1,500	
October 23	at Cal State Hayward	Pioneer Stadium; Hayward, CA	W 21–17	1,500	
October 29	Sacramento State	Cox Stadium; San Francisco, CA	W 10–9	300	
November 6	at Humboldt State	Redwood Bowl; Arcata, CA	L 0–19	4,000	
November 13	UC Davis	Cox Stadium; San Francisco, CA	L 9–23	1,000	
November 20	Cal Lutheran*	Cox Stadium; San Francisco, CA	L 16–21	700	
*Non-conference game
