= 1977 Weber State Wildcats football team =

American college football season

1977 Weber State Wildcats football
- Conference: Big Sky Conference
- Record: 4–6 (2–4 Big Sky)
- Head coach: Pete Riehlman (1st season)
- Home stadium: Wildcat Stadium

1977 Big Sky Conference football standings
	Conf.					Overall
Team	W		L		T	W		L		T
No. T–5 Boise State $	6	–	0	–	0	9	–	2	–	0
No. T–5 Northern Arizona ^	5	–	1	–	0	9	–	3	–	0
Montana State	3	–	3	–	0	6	–	4	–	0
Weber State	2	–	4	–	0	4	–	6	–	0
Idaho State	2	–	4	–	0	3	–	8	–	0
Idaho	2	–	4	–	0	3	–	8	–	0
Montana	1	–	5	–	0	4	–	6	–	0
$ – Conference champion; ^ – NCAA Division II playoff participant; Boise State concluded its regular season after the NCAA Division II playoffs started; runner-up Northern Arizona was awarded playoff bid.; Rankings from NCAA Division II AP Poll

The 1977 Weber State Wildcats football team represented Weber State College (now known as Weber State University) as a member of the Big Sky Conference during the 1977 NCAA Division II football season. Led by first-year head coach Pete Riehlman, the Wildcats compiled an overall record of 4–6, with a mark of 2–4 in conference play, and finished tied for fourth in the Big Sky.

== Schedule ==
Date	Opponent	Site	Result	Attendance	Source
September 10	Boise State	Wildcat Stadium; Ogden, UT	L 9–19	13,440	
September 17	Portland State*	Wildcat Stadium; Ogden, UT	W 40–22	8,289	
September 24	Northern Arizona	Wildcat Stadium; Ogden, UT	L 10–36	10,014	
October 1	at Montana	Dornblaser Field; Missoula, MT	W 31–23	6,200	
October 8	at Montana State	Reno H. Sales Stadium; Bozeman, MT	L 24–27	10,000	
October 15	at UNLV*	Las Vegas Silver Bowl; Whitney, NV	L 13–26	13,318–13,918	
October 22	Bemidji State*	Wildcat Stadium; Ogden, UT	W 31–28	4,413	
October 29	Idaho	Wildcat Stadium; Ogden, UT	W 30–27	3,000	
November 5	Utah State*	Wildcat Stadium; Ogden, UT	L 14–23	8,163	
November 12	at Idaho State	ASISU Minidome; Pocatello, ID	L 18–21	5,090	
*Non-conference game
