= 1977 Cal Poly Mustangs football team =

American college football season

1977 Cal Poly Mustangs football

CCAA champion
- Conference: California Collegiate Athletic Association
- Record: 6–4 (2–0 CCAA)
- Head coach: Joe Harper (10th season)
- Home stadium: Mustang Stadium

1977 California Collegiate Athletic Association football standings
	Conf.					Overall
Team	W		L		T	W		L		T
Cal Poly $	2	–	0	–	0	6	–	4	–	0
Cal State Northridge	1	–	1	–	0	7	–	3	–	1
Cal Poly Pomona	0	–	2	–	0	2	–	8	–	0
Cal State Los Angeles	0	–	0	–	0	4	–	5	–	0
$ – Conference champion

The 1977 Cal Poly Mustangs football team represented California Polytechnic State University, San Luis Obispo as a member of the California Collegiate Athletic Association (CCAA) during the 1977 NCAA Division II football season. Led by tenth-year head coach Joe Harper, Cal Poly compiled an overall record of 6–4 with a mark of 2–0 in conference play, winning the CCAA title for the second consecutive season. The Mustangs played home games at Mustang Stadium in San Luis Obispo, California.

== Schedule ==
Date	Opponent	Site	Result	Attendance	Source
September 10	at Portland State*	Civic Stadium; Portland, OR	W 29–22	9,562	
September 24	at Sacramento State*	Hornet Stadium; Sacramento, CA	W 31–7	4,500	
October 1	Fresno State*	Mustang Stadium; San Luis Obispo, CA	L 3–52	8,322	
October 8	Nevada*	Mustang Stadium; San Luis Obispo, CA	L 29–48	5,123–5,200	
October 15	Northern Colorado*	Mustang Stadium; San Luis Obispo, CA	W 29–20	4,460	
October 22	at Cal State Fullerton*	Falcon Stadium; Norwalk, CA	L 18–45	2,613	
October 29	Simon Fraser*	Mustang Stadium; San Luis Obispo, CA	W 34–20	4,950	
November 5	at Cal State Northridge	Devonshire Downs; Northridge, CA	W 42–14	4,500	
November 12	at Boise State*	Bronco Stadium; Boise, ID	L 21–42	17,028	
November 19	Cal Poly Pomona	Mustang Stadium; San Luis Obispo, CA	W 24–14	4,050	
*Non-conference game

== Team players in the NFL ==
The following Cal Poly Mustang players were selected in the 1978 NFL draft.

Player	Position	Round	Overall	NFL team
Jimmy Childs	Wide receiver	4	97	St. Louis Cardinals
Andre Keys	Wide receiver	8	214	Pittsburgh Steelers
