= 1977 Montana Grizzlies football team =

American college football season

1977 Montana Grizzlies football
- Conference: Big Sky Conference
- Record: 4–6 (1–5 Big Sky)
- Head coach: Gene Carlson (2nd season)
- Offensive coordinator: Dave Nickel (1st season)
- Defensive coordinator: Pokey Allen (1st season)
- Home stadium: Dornblaser Field

1977 Big Sky Conference football standings
	Conf.					Overall
Team	W		L		T	W		L		T
No. T–5 Boise State $	6	–	0	–	0	9	–	2	–	0
No. T–5 Northern Arizona ^	5	–	1	–	0	9	–	3	–	0
Montana State	3	–	3	–	0	6	–	4	–	0
Weber State	2	–	4	–	0	4	–	6	–	0
Idaho State	2	–	4	–	0	3	–	8	–	0
Idaho	2	–	4	–	0	3	–	8	–	0
Montana	1	–	5	–	0	4	–	6	–	0
$ – Conference champion; ^ – NCAA Division II playoff participant; Boise State concluded its regular season after the NCAA Division II playoffs started; runner-up Northern Arizona was awarded playoff bid.; Rankings from NCAA Division II AP Poll

The 1977 Montana Grizzlies football team was an American football team that represented the University of Montana in the Big Sky Conference during the 1977 NCAA Division II football season. In their second year under head coach Gene Carlson, the team compiled a 4–6 record.

== Schedule ==
Date	Opponent	Site	Result	Attendance	Source
September 10	UNLV*	Dornblaser Field; Missoula, MT	L 13–15	6,500	
September 17	at Northern Arizona	NAU Skydome; Flagstaff, AZ	L 24–25	12,860	
September 24	Portland State*	Dornblaser Field; Missoula, MT	W 40–25	6,100	
October 1	Weber State	Dornblaser Field; Missoula, MT	L 23–31	6,200	
October 8	No. 4 Boise State	Dornblaser Field; Missoula, MT	L 17–43	8,400	
October 15	at Idaho	Kibbie Dome; Moscow, ID (rivalry)	L 20–31	15,200	
October 22	Idaho State	Dornblaser Field; Missoula, MT	W 17–15	5,500	
October 29	at Montana State	Reno H. Sales Stadium; Bozeman, MT (rivalry)	L 19–24	15,050	
November 5	Northern Colorado*	Dornblaser Field; Missoula, MT	W 34–13	5,200	
November 12	at Puget Sound*	Federal Way Stadium; Federal Way, WA	W 18–17	3,131	
*Non-conference game; Rankings from AP Poll released prior to the game

== Roster ==
1977 Montana Grizzlies football team roster
Players			Coaches
Offense: Pos. / # / Name / Class; QB / 11 / Tim Kerr / Sr	Defense: Pos. / # / Name / Class	Special teams: Pos. / # / Name / Class	Head coach: Gene Carlson; Coordinators/assistant coaches Legend: (C) Team captain; (S) Suspended; (I) Ineligible; Injured; Redshirt
