= 1976 Cal Poly Mustangs football team =

American college football season

1976 Cal Poly Mustangs football

CCAA champion
- Conference: California Collegiate Athletic Association
- Record: 7–1–1 (2–0 CCAA)
- Head coach: Joe Harper (9th season)
- Home stadium: Mustang Stadium

1976 California Collegiate Athletic Association football standings
	Conf.					Overall
Team	W		L		T	W		L		T
Cal Poly $	2	–	0	–	0	7	–	1	–	1
Cal Poly Pomona	1	–	1	–	0	4	–	5	–	1
Cal State Northridge	1	–	2	–	0	8	–	3	–	0
Cal State Los Angeles	0	–	1	–	0	5	–	3	–	1
$ – Conference champion

The 1976 Cal Poly Mustangs football team represented California Polytechnic State University, San Luis Obispo as a member of the California Collegiate Athletic Association (CCAA) during the 1976 NCAA Division II football season. Led by ninth-year head coach Joe Harper, Cal Poly compiled an overall record of 7–1–1 with a mark of 2–0 in conference play, winning the CCAA title for the first of five consecutive seasons. The Mustangs played home games at Mustang Stadium in San Luis Obispo, California.

The CCAA lost two of its five members before the 1976 season. The UC Riverside Highlanders football program discontinued football after the 1975 season and the Cal State Los Angeles Diablos became an NCAA Division II independent. The CCAA continued with just the three teams until the conference stopped sponsoring football after the 1981 season.

== Schedule ==
Date	Opponent	Site	Result	Attendance	Source
September 18	at Idaho State*	ASISU Minidome; Pocatello, ID	W 29–17	8,500	
October 2	Cal State Northridge	Mustang Stadium; San Luis Obispo, CA	W 19–7	7,350	
October 9	Boise State*	Mustang Stadium; San Luis Obispo, CA	T 14–14	7,050	
October 16	at Fresno State*	Ratcliffe Stadium; Fresno, CA	W 17–15	12,650	
October 30	at UNLV*	Las Vegas Stadium; Whitney, NV	L 10–28	11,136–11,138	
November 6	United States International*	Mustang Stadium; San Luis Obispo, CA	W 42–6	4,950	
November 13	at Cal Poly Pomona	Kellogg Field; Pomona, CA	W 26–22	4,150	
November 20	UC Davis*	Mustang Stadium; San Luis Obispo, CA (rivalry)	W 26–14	5,850	
November 25	Sacramento State*	Mustang Stadium; San Luis Obispo, CA	W 34–10	2,050	
*Non-conference game

== Team players in the NFL ==
No Cal Poly Mustang players were selected in the 1977 NFL draft.

The following finished their college career in 1976, were not drafted, but played in the NFL.

Player	Position	First NFL team
Dana Nafziger	Tight end, linebacker	1977 Tampa Bay Buccaneers
