= 1976 Sacramento State Hornets football team =

American college football season

1976 Sacramento State Hornets football
- Conference: Far Western Conference
- Record: 2–8 (2–3 FWC)
- Head coach: Glenn Brady (1st season)
- Home stadium: Hornet Stadium

1976 Far Western Conference football standings
	Conf.					Overall
Team	W		L		T	W		L		T
UC Davis $	5	–	0	–	0	8	–	2	–	0
Humboldt State	4	–	1	–	0	5	–	5	–	0
Chico State	2	–	3	–	0	5	–	6	–	0
San Francisco State	2	–	3	–	0	4	–	7	–	0
Sacramento State	2	–	3	–	0	2	–	8	–	0
Cal State Hayward	0	–	5	–	0	1	–	8	–	1
$ – Conference champion

The 1976 Sacramento State Hornets football team represented California State University, Sacramento as a member of the Far Western Conference (FWC) during the 1976 NCAA Division II football season. Led by first-year head coach Glenn Brady, Sacramento State compiled an overall record of 2–8 with a mark of 2–3 in conference play, placing in a three-way tie for third place in the FWC. The team was outscored by its opponents 252 to 142 for the season. The Hornets played home games at Hornet Stadium in Sacramento, California.

== Schedule ==
Date	Opponent	Site	Result	Attendance	Source
September 18	Santa Clara*	Hornet Stadium; Sacramento, CA	L 23–37		
September 25	at Cal State Los Angeles*	Campus Field; Los Angeles, CA	L 0–10	1,800–2,500	
October 9	Puget Sound*	Hornet Stadium; Sacramento, CA	L 14–34		
October 16	Humboldt State	Hornet Stadium; Sacramento, CA	L 13–22		
October 23	UC Davis	Hornet Stadium; Sacramento, CA (rivalry)	L 0–34	6,900	
October 29	at San Francisco State	Cox Stadium; San Francisco, CA	L 9–10	300	
November 6	at Nevada*	Mackay Stadium; Reno, NV	L 27–42	5,800	
November 13	Chico State	Hornet Stadium; Sacramento, CA	W 19–5	550	
November 20	at Cal State Hayward	Pioneer Stadium; Hayward, CA	W 27–24	1,000	
November 25	at Cal Poly*	Mustang Stadium; San Luis Obispo, CA	L 10–34	2,050	
*Non-conference game
