= 1976 Humboldt State Lumberjacks football team =

American college football season

1976 Humboldt State Lumberjacks football
- Conference: Far Western Conference
- Record: 5–5 (4–1 FWC)
- Head coach: Bud Van Deren (11th season)
- Home stadium: Redwood Bowl

1976 Far Western Conference football standings
	Conf.					Overall
Team	W		L		T	W		L		T
UC Davis $	5	–	0	–	0	8	–	2	–	0
Humboldt State	4	–	1	–	0	5	–	5	–	0
Chico State	2	–	3	–	0	5	–	6	–	0
San Francisco State	2	–	3	–	0	4	–	7	–	0
Sacramento State	2	–	3	–	0	2	–	8	–	0
Cal State Hayward	0	–	5	–	0	1	–	8	–	1
$ – Conference champion

The 1976 Humboldt State Lumberjacks football team represented Humboldt State University—now known as California State Polytechnic University, Humboldt—as a member of the Far Western Conference (FWC) during the 1976 NCAA Division II football season. Led by 11th-year head coach Bud Van Deren, the Lumberjacks compiled an overall record of 5–5 with a mark of 4–1 in conference play, placing second in the FWC. The team was outscored by its opponents 261 to 154 for the season. Humboldt State played home games at the Redwood Bowl in Arcata, California.

== Schedule ==
Date	Opponent	Site	Result	Attendance	Source
September 18	Humboldt State alumni*	Redwood Bowl; Arcata, CA	W 37–28		
September 25	at Boise State*	Bronco Stadium; Boise, ID	L 0–33	17,837	
October 2	at Puget Sound*	Baker Stadium; Tacoma, WA	L 0–37		
October 9	Cal State Hayward	Redwood Bowl; Arcata, CA	W 14–10	2,500	
October 16	at Sacramento State	Hornet Stadium; Sacramento, CA	W 22–13		
October 23	at Portland State*	Civic Stadium; Portland, OR	L 20–56		
October 30	at UC Davis	Toomey Field; Davis, CA	L 7–35	6,400	
November 6	San Francisco State	Redwood Bowl; Arcata, CA	W 19–0	4,000	
November 13	Simon Fraser*	Redwood Bowl; Arcata, CA	L 6–29		
November 20	Chico State	Redwood Bowl; Arcata, CA	W 29–20	3,500	
*Non-conference game
