= 1976 UC Davis Aggies football team =

American college football season

1976 UC Davis Aggies football

FWC champion
- Conference: Far Western Conference
- Record: 8–2 (5–0 FWC)
- Head coach: Jim Sochor (7th season)
- Captains: Dave Bon; Jim Speck
- Home stadium: Toomey Field

1976 Far Western Conference football standings
	Conf.					Overall
Team	W		L		T	W		L		T
UC Davis $	5	–	0	–	0	8	–	2	–	0
Humboldt State	4	–	1	–	0	5	–	5	–	0
Chico State	2	–	3	–	0	5	–	6	–	0
San Francisco State	2	–	3	–	0	4	–	7	–	0
Sacramento State	2	–	3	–	0	2	–	8	–	0
Cal State Hayward	0	–	5	–	0	1	–	8	–	1
$ – Conference champion

The 1976 UC Davis Aggies football team represented the University of California, Davis as a member of the Far Western Conference (FWC) during the 1976 NCAA Division II football season. Led by seventh-year head coach Jim Sochor, UC Davis compiled an overall record of 8–2 with a mark of 5–0 in conference play, winning the FWC title for the sixth consecutive season. 1975 was the seventh consecutive winning season for the Aggies. With the 5–0 conference record, they stretched their conference winning streak to 18 games dating back to the 1973 season. The team outscored its opponents 233 to 112 for the season. The Aggies played home games at Toomey Field in Davis, California.

== Schedule ==
Date	Opponent	Site	Result	Attendance	Source
September 11	UC Davis alumni*	Toomey Field; Davis, CA	W 17–13	1,700	
September 18	Cal Poly Pomona*	Toomey Field; Davis, CA	W 28–7	5,300	
September 25	at Cal State Northridge*	North Campus Stadium; Northridge, CA	L 3–17	3,000–3,500	
October 9	at Chico State	University Stadium; Chico, CA	W 26–6	5,500–5,580	
October 16	Cal State Hayward	Toomey Field; Davis, CA	W 25–14	5,700–7,050	
October 23	at Sacramento State	Charles C. Hughes Stadium; Sacramento, CA (rivalry)	W 34–0	6,900	
October 30	Humboldt State	Toomey Field; Davis, CA	W 35–7	6,400	
November 6	Santa Clara*	Toomey Field; Davis, CA	W 28–13	7,000	
November 13	at San Francisco State	Cox Stadium; San Francisco, CA	W 23–9	1,000	
November 20	at Cal Poly*	Mustang Stadium; San Luis Obispo, CA (rivalry)	L 14–26	5,850	
*Non-conference game

== NFL draft ==
The following UC Davis Aggies players were selected in the 1977 NFL draft.

Player	Position	Round	Overall	NFL team
Rolf Benirschke	Kicker	12	334	Oakland Raiders
