= 1977 Cal Poly Pomona Broncos football team =

American college football season

1977 Cal Poly Pomona Broncos football
- Conference: California Collegiate Athletic Association
- Record: 2–8 (0–2 CCAA)
- Head coach: Jim Jones (1st season)
- Home stadium: Kellogg Field

1977 California Collegiate Athletic Association football standings
	Conf.					Overall
Team	W		L		T	W		L		T
Cal Poly $	2	–	0	–	0	6	–	4	–	0
Cal State Northridge	1	–	1	–	0	7	–	3	–	1
Cal Poly Pomona	0	–	2	–	0	2	–	8	–	0
Cal State Los Angeles	0	–	0	–	0	4	–	5	–	0
$ – Conference champion

The 1977 Cal Poly Pomona Broncos football team represented California State Polytechnic University, Pomona as a member of the California Collegiate Athletic Association (CCAA) during the 1977 NCAA Division II football season. Led by first-year head coach Jim Jones, Cal Poly Pomona compiled an overall record of 2–8 with a mark of 0–2 in conference play, placing last of three teams in the CCAA. The team was outscored by its opponents 264 to 115 for the season. The Broncos played home games at Kellogg Field in Pomona, California.

== Schedule ==
Date	Opponent	Site	Result	Attendance	Source
September 10	at Puget Sound*	Baker Stadium; Tacoma, WA	L 0–7	4,263	
September 17	at San Francisco State*	Cox Stadium; San Francisco, CA	L 18–21	1,400	
October 1	UC Davis*	Kellogg Field; Pomona, CA	L 14–27	2,500	
October 8	Northern Arizona*	Kellogg Field; Pomona, CA	L 0–16	2,500	
October 22	at Ball State*	Ball State Stadium; Muncie, ID	L 10–66	13,176	
October 29	Cal State Northridge	Kellogg Field; Pomona, CA	L 0–19	2,500	
November 5	at Cal State Fullerton*	Falcon Stadium; Norwalk, CA	L 0–48	1,614	
November 12	Santa Clara*	Kellogg Field; Pomona, CA	W 31–14	2,500–3,000	
November 19	at Cal Poly	Mustang Stadium; San Luis Obispo, CA	L 14–24	4,050	
November 26	Cal State Hayward*	Kellogg Field; Pomona, CA	W 28–22	2,000	
*Non-conference game
