= 1976 Cal Poly Pomona Broncos football team =

American college football season

1976 Cal Poly Pomona Broncos football
- Conference: California Collegiate Athletic Association
- Record: 4–5–1 (1–1 CCAA)
- Head coach: Andy Vinci (3rd season)
- Home stadium: Kellogg Field

1976 California Collegiate Athletic Association football standings
	Conf.					Overall
Team	W		L		T	W		L		T
Cal Poly $	2	–	0	–	0	7	–	1	–	1
Cal Poly Pomona	1	–	1	–	0	4	–	5	–	1
Cal State Northridge	1	–	2	–	0	8	–	3	–	0
Cal State Los Angeles	0	–	1	–	0	5	–	3	–	1
$ – Conference champion

The 1976 Cal Poly Pomona Broncos football team represented California State Polytechnic University, Pomona as a member of the California Collegiate Athletic Association (CCAA) during the 1976 NCAA Division II football season. Led by Andy Vinci in his third and final season as head coach, Cal Poly Pomona finished the season with an overall record of 3–6–1 with a mark of 1–1 in conference play, placing second in the CCAA. The team was outscored by its opponents 199 to 135 for the season. The Broncos played home games at Kellogg Field in Pomona, California.

Mississippi State was later required to forfeit all nine of their victories in the 1976 season, including their win over Cal Poly Pomona on October 2. With the forfeit, Cal Poly Pomona's overall record in 1976 improved to 4–5–1.

== Schedule ==
Date	Opponent	Site	Result	Attendance	Source
September 11	Cal State Fullerton*	Kellogg Field; Pomona, CA	T 10–10	3,493–3,494	
September 18	at UC Davis*	Toomey Field; Davis, CA	L 7–28	5,300	
September 25	San Francisco State*	Kellogg Field; Pomona, CA	L 19–22	2,500	
October 2	at Mississippi State*	Scott Field; Mississippi State, MS	W 0–38 (forfeit win)	33,000	
October 9	at North Texas State*	Fouts Field; Denton, TX	L 10–21	11,200	
October 16	at Northern Arizona*	Lumberjack Stadium; Flagstaff, AZ	W 9–7	12,800	
October 23	United States International*	Kellogg Field; Pomona, CA	W 28–14	2,500	
November 6	at Cal State Northridge	Devonshire Downs; Northridge, CA	W 20–7	3,500	
November 13	at Cal Poly	Mustang Stadium; San Luis Obispo, CA	L 22–26	4,150	
November 20	Puget Sound*	Kellogg Field; Pomona, CA	L 10–26	2,500	
*Non-conference game
