= 1976 Fresno State Bulldogs football team =

American college football season

1976 Fresno State Bulldogs football
- Conference: Pacific Coast Athletic Association
- Record: 5–6 (3–1 PCAA)
- Head coach: Jim Sweeney (1st season)
- Offensive coordinator: Dennis Erickson (1st season)
- Home stadium: Ratcliffe Stadium

1976 Pacific Coast Athletic Association football standings
	Conf.					Overall
Team	W		L		T	W		L		T
San Jose State $	4	–	0	–	0	7	–	4	–	0
Fresno State	3	–	1	–	0	5	–	6	–	0
Long Beach State	2	–	2	–	0	8	–	3	–	0
Cal State Fullerton	1	–	3	–	0	3	–	7	–	1
Pacific (CA)	0	–	4	–	0	2	–	9	–	0
$ – Conference champion

The 1976 Fresno State Bulldogs football team represented California State University, Fresno as a member of the Pacific Coast Athletic Association (PCAA) during the 1976 NCAA Division I football season. Led by first-year head coach Jim Sweeney, Fresno State compiled an overall record of 5–6 with a mark of 3–1 in conference play, placing second in the PCAA. The Bulldogs played their home games at Ratcliffe Stadium on the campus of Fresno City College in Fresno, California.

While Fresno State lost its opener on the road to Southwestern Louisiana, the game was subsequently forfeited due to the use of ineligible players. The won-loss record is not adjusted.

An experienced head coach, Sweeney was hired in December 1975, shortly after his resignation from Washington State University. He had led the Cougars of the Pac-8 Conference for eight seasons, preceded by five at Montana State in the Big Sky Conference.

== Schedule ==
Date	Opponent	Site	Result	Attendance	Source
September 11	at Southwestern Louisiana*	Cajun Field; Lafayette, LA	L 14–41	22,890	
September 18	at San Diego State*	San Diego Stadium; San Diego, CA (rivalry)	L 3–7	40,768	
September 25	No. 3 Montana State*	Ratcliffe Stadium; Fresno, CA	W 24–10	11,500	
October 2	Cal State Fullerton	Ratcliffe Stadium; Fresno, CA	W 31–12	11,500	
October 9	at Wichita State*	Cessna Stadium; Wichita, KS	L 24–30	12,609	
October 16	Cal Poly*	Ratcliffe Stadium; Fresno, CA	L 15–17	12,650	
October 23	at San Jose State	Spartan Stadium; San Jose, CA (rivalry)	L 7–21	16,500	
October 30	Pacific (CA)	Ratcliffe Stadium; Fresno, CA	W 35–7	10,200	
November 6	Long Beach State	Ratcliffe Stadium; Fresno, CA	W 23–0	11,100	
November 13	New Mexico State*	Ratcliffe Stadium; Fresno, CA	W 44–0	8,279	
November 20	at Santa Clara*	Stevens Stadium; Santa Clara, CA	L 17–20		
*Non-conference game; Rankings from AP Poll released prior to the game
