= 1976 San Jose State Spartans football team =

American college football season

1976 San Jose State Spartans football

PCAA champion
- Conference: Pacific Coast Athletic Association
- Record: 7–4 (4–0 PCAA)
- Head coach: Lynn Stiles (1st season)
- Offensive coordinator: Doug Kay (1st season)
- Home stadium: Spartan Stadium

1976 Pacific Coast Athletic Association football standings
	Conf.					Overall
Team	W		L		T	W		L		T
San Jose State $	4	–	0	–	0	7	–	4	–	0
Fresno State	3	–	1	–	0	5	–	6	–	0
Long Beach State	2	–	2	–	0	8	–	3	–	0
Cal State Fullerton	1	–	3	–	0	3	–	7	–	1
Pacific (CA)	0	–	4	–	0	2	–	9	–	0
$ – Conference champion

The 1976 San Jose State Spartans football team represented San Jose State University during the 1976 NCAA Division I football season as a member of the Pacific Coast Athletic Association. (Note: The Big West Conference was known as the Pacific Coast Athletic Association from its founding in 1969 through 1987.) The team was led by first year head coach Lynn Stiles. They played home games at Spartan Stadium in San Jose, California. The Spartans finished the season as champions of the PCAA for the second year in a row, with a record of seven wins and four losses (7–4, 4–0 PCAA).

== Schedule ==
Date	Opponent	Site	TV	Result	Attendance	Source
September 4	Utah State*	Spartan Stadium; San Jose, CA		W 45–10	19,123	
September 11	Hawaii*	Spartan Stadium; San Jose, CA (rivalry)		W 48–7	19,500	
September 18	at Cal State Fullerton*	Falcon Stadium; Norwalk, CA		W 20–0	5,644	
September 25	at Stanford*	Stanford Stadium; Stanford, CA (rivalry)	ABC	L 23–28	51,000	
October 2	at California*	California Memorial Stadium; Berkeley, CA		L 16–43	42,120	
October 9	at New Mexico*	University Stadium; Albuquerque, NM		L 30–36	23,545	
October 16	Long Beach State	Spartan Stadium; San Jose, CA		W 34–7	18,500	
October 23	Fresno State	Spartan Stadium; San Jose, CA (rivalry)		W 21–7	16,500	
October 30	Santa Clara*^{†}	Spartan Stadium; San Jose, CA		W 50–15	17,500	
November 6	at San Diego State*	San Diego Stadium; San Diego, CA		L 17–30	40,710	
November 13	at Pacific (CA)	Pacific Memorial Stadium; Stockton, CA (Victory Bell)		W 50–30	18,093	
*Non-conference game; ^{†}Homecoming

== Team players in the NFL ==
The following were selected in the 1977 NFL draft.

Player	Position	Round	Overall	NFL team
Wilson Faumuina	Defensive tackle – Defensive end – Nose tackle	1	20	Atlanta Falcons
Rick Kane	Running back	3	69	Detroit Lions
Jim LeJay	Wide receiver	10	270	St. Louis Cardinals
Steve DeBerg	Quarterback	10	275	Dallas Cowboys
John Blain	Tackle	11	285	New Orleans Saints
