= 1976 Cal State Los Angeles Diablos football team =

American college football season

1976 Cal State Los Angeles Diablos football
- Conference: California Collegiate Athletic Association
- Record: 5–3–1 (0–1 CCAA)
- Head coach: Ron Hull (1st season)
- Home stadium: Campus Field

1976 California Collegiate Athletic Association football standings
	Conf.					Overall
Team	W		L		T	W		L		T
Cal Poly $	2	–	0	–	0	7	–	1	–	1
Cal Poly Pomona	1	–	1	–	0	4	–	5	–	1
Cal State Northridge	1	–	2	–	0	8	–	3	–	0
Cal State Los Angeles	0	–	1	–	0	5	–	3	–	1
$ – Conference champion

The 1976 Cal State Los Angeles Diablos football team represented California State University, Los Angeles as a member of the California Collegiate Athletic Association (CCAA) during the 1976 NCAA Division II football season. Led by first-year head coach Ron Hull, the Diablos compiled an overall record of 5–3–1 with a mark of 0–1 in conference play, placing last out of four team in the CCAA.. The team outscored its opponents 170 to 119 for the season. The Diablos played home games at Campus Field in Los Angeles.

== Schedule ==
Date	Opponent	Site	Result	Attendance	Source
September 18	United States International*	Campus Field; Los Angeles, CA	W 41–12	1,000	
September 25	Sacramento State*	Campus Field; Los Angeles, CA	W 10–0	1,800–2,500	
October 1	San Francisco State*	Campus Field; Los Angeles, CA	W 10–0	750–1,000	
October 9	at Cal State Northridge	Devonshire Downs; Northridge, CA	L 13–24	3,000–3,500	
October 23	at Cal Lutheran*	Mt. Clef Field; Thousand Oaks, CA	L 21–24	2,100–2,500	
October 30	at San Diego*	Torero Stadium; San Diego, CA	W 30–10	1,500	
November 6	Azusa Pacific*	Campus Field; Los Angeles, CA	W 17–14	2,000–3,000	
November 13	Cal State Hayward*	Campus Field; Los Angeles, CA	T 21–21	1,500–2,500	
November 20	Southern Utah State*	Campus Field; Los Angeles, CA	L 7–14	4,000	
*Non-conference game
