= Craig Juntunen =

American gridiron football player (born 1954)

Profile
- Position: Quarterback

Personal information
- Born: December 12, 1954 (age 71)
- Listed height: 6 ft 1 in (1.85 m)
- Listed weight: 194 lb (88 kg)

Career information
- High school: San Jose (CA) Lynbrook
- College: Idaho

Career history
- 1978: Calgary Stampeders
- 1979: Saskatchewan Roughriders

Craig Juntunen (born December 12, 1954) is an American former professional football quarterback who played two seasons in the Canadian Football League (CFL) with the Calgary Stampeders and Saskatchewan Roughriders. He played college football at the University of Idaho.

After a successful career in business, Juntunen sold his company at age 43 and retired; he is an advocate for international adoption reform.

== Early life ==
Juntunen attended Lynbrook High School in San Jose, California, and graduated in 1974.

== College career ==
Juntunen began his college football career nearby at De Anza Junior College in Cupertino, west of San Jose. Sight unseen, he transferred to the University of Idaho in Moscow in 1976 to play for head coach Ed Troxel, splitting time with Rocky Tuttle at quarterback for the Vandals as a junior. Idaho was 7–4 that season, at the time one of the best records in school history. As a senior in 1977, Juntunen was a co-captain and the team's offensive MVP, completing 52.7 percent of his passes for 770 yards and three touchdowns. He was inducted into the State of Idaho Athletic Hall of Fame and the University of Idaho Athletics Hall of Fame.

== Professional career ==
Juntunen played in the CFL for two seasons, for the Calgary Stampeders in 1978 and the Saskatchewan Roughriders in 1979.

== Personal life ==
At age 43, Juntunen sold a successful human resources firm in the Silicon Valley of northern California and retired in 1998, spending the next several years hanging out on ski slopes and playing golf. Following a conversation with a friend who had adopted a child from Haiti, Juntunen and his wife adopted three children from the impoverished nation and became an advocate for international adoption reform. He wrote the book Both Ends Burning and produced the documentary film Stuck.

== Video ==
- Interview of Craig Juntunen - 2012
- ABC Nightline - 2013
