= 1976 Pacific Tigers football team =

American college football season

1976 Pacific Tigers football
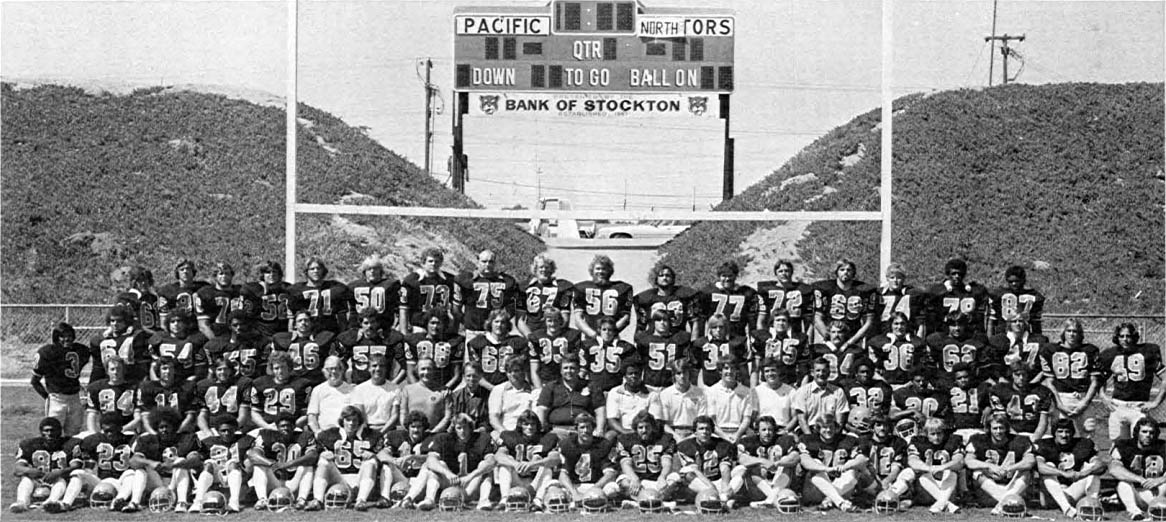
- Conference: Pacific Coast Athletic Association
- Record: 2–9 (0–4 PCAA)
- Head coach: Chester Caddas (5th season)
- Home stadium: Pacific Memorial Stadium

1976 Pacific Coast Athletic Association football standings
	Conf.					Overall
Team	W		L		T	W		L		T
San Jose State $	4	–	0	–	0	7	–	4	–	0
Fresno State	3	–	1	–	0	5	–	6	–	0
Long Beach State	2	–	2	–	0	8	–	3	–	0
Cal State Fullerton	1	–	3	–	0	3	–	7	–	1
Pacific (CA)	0	–	4	–	0	2	–	9	–	0
$ – Conference champion

The 1976 Pacific Tigers football team represented the University of the Pacific (UOP) in the 1976 NCAA Division I football season as a member of the Pacific Coast Athletic Association. (Note: The Big West Conference was known as the Pacific Coast Athletic Association from its founding in 1969 through 1987.)

The team was led by head coach Chester Caddas, in his fifth year, and played their home games at Pacific Memorial Stadium (Note: Amos Alonzo Stagg Memorial Stadium was known as Pacific Memorial Stadium from its opening in 1950 through 1987.) in Stockton, California. They finished the season with a record of two wins and nine losses (2–9, 0–4 PCAA). The Tigers were outscored 190–301 over the season, including six straight losses to end the season.

== Schedule ==
Date	Opponent	Site	Result	Attendance	Source
September 11	at Air Force*	Falcon Stadium; Colorado Springs, CO	L 3–36	21,347	
September 18	Idaho*	Pacific Memorial Stadium; Stockton, CA	L 28–31	11,769	
September 25	Hawaii*	Pacific Memorial Stadium; Stockton, CA	W 21–12	8,625	
October 2	Long Beach State	Pacific Memorial Stadium; Stockton, CA	L 14–17	7,318	
October 9	No. 2 UNLV*	Pacific Memorial Stadium; Stockton, CA	W 38–13	9,327	
October 16	at San Diego State*	San Diego Stadium; San Diego, CA	L 15–21	31,045	
October 23	at Southwestern Louisiana*	Cajun Field; Lafayette, LA	L 10–38		
October 30	at Fresno State	Ratcliffe Stadium; Fresno, CA	L 7–35	10,200	
November 6	at Cal State Fullerton	Falcon Stadium; Norwalk, CA	L 7–17	2,168	
November 13	San Jose State^{†}	Pacific Memorial Stadium; Stockton, CA (Victory Bell)	L 30–50	18,093	
November 20	at Utah State*	Romney Stadium; Logan, UT	L 17–31	11,075	
*Non-conference game; ^{†}Homecoming; Rankings from AP Poll released prior to the game

== Team players in the NFL ==
The following UOP players were selected in the 1977 NFL draft.

Player	Position	Round	Overall	NFL team
Al Cleveland	Defensive end	8	208	Dallas Cowboys
