= 1976 Weber State Wildcats football team =

American college football season

1976 Weber State Wildcats football
- Conference: Big Sky Conference
- Record: 2–9 (1–5 Big Sky)
- Head coach: Dick Gwinn (4th season)
- Home stadium: Wildcat Stadium

1976 Big Sky Conference football standings
	Conf.					Overall
Team	W		L		T	W		L		T
No. 1 Montana State $^	6	–	0	–	0	12	–	1	–	0
Idaho	5	–	1	–	0	7	–	4	–	0
Northern Arizona	4	–	2	–	0	8	–	3	–	0
Montana	3	–	3	–	0	4	–	6	–	0
Boise State	2	–	4	–	0	5	–	5	–	1
Weber State	1	–	5	–	0	2	–	9	–	0
Idaho State	0	–	6	–	0	1	–	9	–	0
$ – Conference champion; ^ – NCAA Division II playoff participant; Rankings from NCAA Division II AP Poll

The 1976 Weber State Wildcats football team represented Weber State College (now known as Weber State University) as a member of the Big Sky Conference during the 1976 NCAA Division II football season. Led by fourth-year head coach Dick Gwinn, the Wildcats compiled an overall record of 2–9, with a mark of 1–5 in conference play, and finished sixth in the Big Sky.

== Schedule ==
Date	Opponent	Site	Result	Attendance	Source
September 11	at Long Beach State*	Veterans Memorial Stadium; Long Beach, CA	L 7–19	5,700	
September 18	at Western Illinois*	Hanson Field; Macomb, IL	L 19–21		
September 25	No. 9 UNLV*	Wildcat Stadium; Ogden, UT	L 16–33	13,602	
October 2	at Montana	Dornblaser Field; Missoula, MT	L 25–28	6,500	
October 9	Montana State	Wildcat Stadium; Ogden, UT	L 0–44	7,422	
October 16	at Idaho	Kibbie Dome; Moscow, ID	L 17–45	15,607	
October 23	Idaho State	Wildcat Stadium; Ogden, UT	W 34–7	5,120	
October 30	at Utah State*	Romney Stadium; Logan, UT	L 10–36	6,441	
November 6	South Dakota State*	Wildcat Stadium; Ogden, UT	W 52–19	3,516	
November 13	at Northern Arizona	Lumberjack Stadium; Flagstaff, AZ	L 18–30	6,150	
November 20	at Boise State	Bronco Stadium; Boise, ID	L 31–56	16,224	
*Non-conference game; Rankings from AP Poll released prior to the game
