= 1977 Boise State Broncos football team =

American college football season

1977 Boise State Broncos football
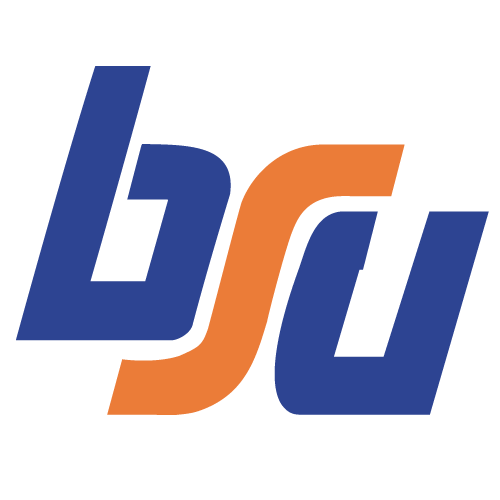

Big Sky champion
- Conference: Big Sky Conference

Ranking
- AP: No. 5 (D-II)
- Record: 9–2 (6–0 Big Sky)
- Head coach: Jim Criner (2nd season)
- Offensive coordinator: Gene Dahlquist (1st season)
- Defensive coordinator: Bill Dutton (2nd season)
- Base defense: 3–4
- Home stadium: Bronco Stadium

1977 Big Sky Conference football standings
	Conf.					Overall
Team	W		L		T	W		L		T
No. T–5 Boise State $	6	–	0	–	0	9	–	2	–	0
No. T–5 Northern Arizona ^	5	–	1	–	0	9	–	3	–	0
Montana State	3	–	3	–	0	6	–	4	–	0
Weber State	2	–	4	–	0	4	–	6	–	0
Idaho State	2	–	4	–	0	3	–	8	–	0
Idaho	2	–	4	–	0	3	–	8	–	0
Montana	1	–	5	–	0	4	–	6	–	0
$ – Conference champion; ^ – NCAA Division II playoff participant; Boise State concluded its regular season after the NCAA Division II playoffs started; runner-up Northern Arizona was awarded playoff bid.; Rankings from NCAA Division II AP Poll

The 1977 Boise State Broncos football team represented Boise State University in the 1977 NCAA Division II football season. The Broncos competed in the Big Sky Conference and played their home games on campus at Bronco Stadium in Boise, Idaho. Led by second-year head coach Jim Criner, the Broncos were 9–2 overall and 6–0 in conference to win the Big Sky title, their fourth in five years.

This was the final season for BSU football in Division II; the Big Sky was in Division I for its other sports and joined the newly created Division I-AA in 1978.

Because of their regular season ending on November 26, Boise State could not participate in the eight-team Division II playoffs, which began earlier that day. Big Sky runner-up Northern Arizona took the berth but suffered a 35-point shutout loss at home.

== Schedule ==
Date	Time	Opponent	Rank	Site	Result	Attendance	Source
September 10		at Weber State		Wildcat Stadium; Ogden, UT	W 19–9	13,440	
September 17		at Fresno State*		Ratcliffe Stadium; Fresno, CA (rivalry)	L 7–42	12,136	
September 24		UNLV*		Bronco Stadium; Boise, ID	W 45–14	20,575	
October 1		No. 1 Montana State		Bronco Stadium; Boise, ID	W 26–0	20,552	
October 8		at Montana	No. 4	Dornblaser Field; Missoula, MT	W 43–17	8,400	
October 15		at Nevada*	No. 3	Mackay Stadium; Reno, NV (rivalry)	L 10–28	11,651	
October 22		Northern Arizona		Bronco Stadium; Boise, ID	W 27–13	20,448	
October 29		Utah State*		Romney Stadium; Logan, UT	W 23–16	6,216	
November 5		Idaho State^{†}	No. 8	Bronco Stadium; Boise, ID	W 31–7	19,850	
November 12		Cal Poly*	No. 6	Bronco Stadium; Boise, ID	W 42–21	17,028	
November 26	8:30 pm	at Idaho	No. 5	Kibbie Dome; Moscow, ID (rivalry)	W 44–14	12,000	
*Non-conference game; ^{†}Homecoming; Rankings from AP Poll released prior to the game; All times are in Mountain time

== Roster ==
1977 Boise State Broncos football team roster
Players
Coaches
Offense

Pos.	#	Name	Class
QB	11	Dee Pickett	Sr
QB	16	Hoskin Hogan	So
TB	20	Cedric Minter	Fr
TB	27	Terry Zahner	Fr
FB	32	Angelo Dillon
FB	33	David Hughes	Fr
TB	40	Fred Goode	Jr
LT	53	Jim Klotz	Sr
C	56	Mark Villano	Jr
RG	60	Alva Liles	Sr
LG	67	John Carter	Sr
RT	74	Harold Cotton	Sr
SE	80	Terry Hutt	Sr
TE	83	Steve Woodard	Sr
FL	89	Lonnie Hughes	Jr

Defense

Pos.	#	Name	Class
LCB	17	Ken West	Sr
RCB	22	Ralph Angstrom	Sr
SS	25	Sam Miller	Jr
FS	49	Nash Balinton	Jr
LB	44	Bob Macauley	Jr
LB	47	Larry Polowski	Jr
LB	55	Willie Beamon	Jr
LB	61	Mike Balbas	Sr
LDT	70	Chris Malmgren	Sr
RDT	75	Doug Scott	So
NG	90	Vince Mendiola	Sr

Special teams

Pos.	#	Name	Class
K	18	Tom Sarette	Jr
P		Cory Bridges

Head coach

- Jim Criner (2nd year)

Coordinators/assistant coaches

- Gene Dahlquist (OC)
- Bill Dutton (DC/DL)
- Chuck Banker (LB)
- Dave Campo (DB)

Legend

- (C) Team captain
- (S) Suspended
- (I) Ineligible
- Injured
- Redshirt
