= 1976 Idaho State Bengals football team =

American college football season

1976 Idaho State Bengals football
- Conference: Big Sky Conference
- Record: 1–9 (0–6 Big Sky)
- Head coach: Joe Pascale (1st season)
- Home stadium: ASISU Minidome

1976 Big Sky Conference football standings
	Conf.					Overall
Team	W		L		T	W		L		T
No. 1 Montana State $^	6	–	0	–	0	12	–	1	–	0
Idaho	5	–	1	–	0	7	–	4	–	0
Northern Arizona	4	–	2	–	0	8	–	3	–	0
Montana	3	–	3	–	0	4	–	6	–	0
Boise State	2	–	4	–	0	5	–	5	–	1
Weber State	1	–	5	–	0	2	–	9	–	0
Idaho State	0	–	6	–	0	1	–	9	–	0
$ – Conference champion; ^ – NCAA Division II playoff participant; Rankings from NCAA Division II AP Poll

The 1976 Idaho State Bengals football team represented Idaho State University as a member of the Big Sky Conference during the 1976 NCAA Division II football season. Led by first-year head coach Joe Pascale, the Bengals compiled an overall record of 1–9, with a mark of 0–6 in conference play, and finished seventh in the Big Sky.

== Schedule ==
Date	Opponent	Site	Result	Attendance	Source
September 11	at Northern Arizona	Lumberjack Stadium; Flagstaff, AZ	L 7–34	8,364	
September 18	Cal Poly*	ASISU Minidome; Pocatello, ID	L 17–29	8,500	
September 25	Nevada*	ASISU Minidome; Pocatello, ID	W 27–22	7,672–7,762	
October 2	at No. 4 UNLV*	Las Vegas Stadium; Whitney, NV	L 17–31	13,702	
October 9	Portland State*	ASISU Minidome; Pocatello, ID	L 14–26	8,695	
October 16	at No. 8 Montana State	Reno H. Sales Stadium; Bozeman, MT	L 7–28	9,600	
October 23	at Weber State	Wildcat Stadium; Ogden, UT	L 7–34	5,120	
October 30	Idaho	ASISU Minidome; Pocatello, ID (rivalry)	L 3–6	9,625	
November 6	at Montana	Dornblaser Field; Missoula, MT	L 17–21	5,000	
November 13	Boise State	ASISU Minidome; Pocatello, ID	L 0–36	9,227	
*Non-conference game; Rankings from AP Poll released prior to the game
