= 1976 Montana Grizzlies football team =

American college football season

1976 Montana Grizzlies football
- Conference: Big Sky Conference
- Record: 4–6 (3–3 Big Sky)
- Head coach: Gene Carlson (1st season)
- Home stadium: Dornblaser Field

1976 Big Sky Conference football standings
	Conf.					Overall
Team	W		L		T	W		L		T
No. 1 Montana State $^	6	–	0	–	0	12	–	1	–	0
Idaho	5	–	1	–	0	7	–	4	–	0
Northern Arizona	4	–	2	–	0	8	–	3	–	0
Montana	3	–	3	–	0	4	–	6	–	0
Boise State	2	–	4	–	0	5	–	5	–	1
Weber State	1	–	5	–	0	2	–	9	–	0
Idaho State	0	–	6	–	0	1	–	9	–	0
$ – Conference champion; ^ – NCAA Division II playoff participant; Rankings from NCAA Division II AP Poll

The 1976 Montana Grizzlies football team was an American football team that represented the University of Montana in the Big Sky Conference during the 1976 NCAA Division II football season. In their first year under head coach Gene Carlson, the team compiled a 4–6 record.

== Schedule ==
Date	Opponent	Site	Result	Attendance	Source
September 11	at UNLV*	Las Vegas Stadium; Whitney, NV	L 19–21	13,848	
September 25	at Portland State*	Civic Stadium; Portland, OR	L 49–50	16,395	
October 2	Weber State	Dornblaser Field; Missoula, MT	W 28–25	6,500	
October 9	Northern Arizona	Dornblaser Field; Missoula, MT	L 21–23	9,607	
October 16	at Boise State	Bronco Stadium; Boise, ID	W 17–14	18,472	
October 23	at Northern Colorado*	Jackson Field; Greeley, CO	L 19–27	7,100	
October 30	No. 4 Montana State	Dornblaser Field; Missoula, MT (rivalry)	L 12–21	12,500	
November 6	Idaho State	Dornblaser Field; Missoula, MT	W 21–17	5,000	
November 13	at Idaho	Kibbie Dome; Moscow, ID (rivalry)	L 19–28	9,396	
November 20	Simon Fraser*	Dornblaser Field; Missoula, MT	W 45–17	3,500	
*Non-conference game; Rankings from AP Poll released prior to the game
