= 1977 Fresno State Bulldogs football team =

American college football season

1977 Fresno State Bulldogs football

PCAA champion
- Conference: Pacific Coast Athletic Association
- Record: 9–2 (4–0 PCAA)
- Head coach: Jim Sweeney (2nd season)
- Offensive coordinator: Dennis Erickson (2nd season)
- Home stadium: Ratcliffe Stadium

1977 Pacific Coast Athletic Association football standings
	Conf.					Overall
Team	W		L		T	W		L		T
Fresno State $	4	–	0	–	0	9	–	2	–	0
Pacific (CA)	3	–	1	–	0	6	–	5	–	0
San Jose State	2	–	2	–	0	4	–	7	–	0
Long Beach State	1	–	3	–	0	4	–	6	–	0
Cal State Fullerton	0	–	4	–	0	4	–	7	–	0
$ – Conference champion

The 1977 Fresno State Bulldogs football team represented California State University, Fresno as a member of the Pacific Coast Athletic Association (PCAA) during the 1977 NCAA Division I football season. Led by second-year head coach Jim Sweeney, Fresno State compiled an overall record of 9–2 with a mark of 4–0 in conference play, winning the PCAA title. The Bulldogs played their home games at Ratcliffe Stadium on the campus of Fresno City College in Fresno, California.

== Schedule ==
Date	Opponent	Site	Result	Attendance	Source
September 6	at Southwestern Louisiana*	Cajun Field; Lafayette, LA	L 13–34	24,600	
September 17	Boise State*	Ratcliffe Stadium; Fresno, CA (rivalry)	W 42–7	10,857	
September 24	at No. 1 Montana State*	Reno H. Sales Stadium; Bozeman, MT	L 14–24	10,100	
October 1	at Cal Poly*	Mustang Stadium; San Juis Obispo, CA	W 52–3	8,322	
October 8	San Diego State*	Ratcliffe Stadium; Fresno, CA (rivalry)	W 34–14	14,114–15,179	
October 15	at Pacific (CA)	Pacific Memorial Stadium; Stockton, CA	W 24–10	13,740	
October 22	San Jose State	Ratcliffe Stadium; Fresno, CA (rivalry)	W 45–24	15,401	
October 29	Idaho State*	Ratcliffe Stadium; Fresno, CA	W 28–7	12,761–13,923	
November 5	at Long Beach State	Anaheim Stadium; Anaheim, CA	W 23–14	5,951	
November 11	at Cal State Fullerton	Falcon Stadium; Norwalk, CA	W 44–19	5,250	
November 19	Santa Clara*	Ratcliffe Stadium; Fresno, CA	W 35–7	12,438	
*Non-conference game; Rankings from AP Poll released prior to the game

== Team players in the NFL ==
The following were selected in the 1978 NFL draft.

Player	Position	Round	Overall	NFL team
Dean Jones	Defensive back	11	291	Oakland Raiders
Bob Glazebrook	Defensive back	11	304	Oakland Raiders
