= 1977 Idaho State Bengals football team =

American college football season

1977 Idaho State Bengals football
- Conference: Big Sky Conference
- Record: 3–8 (2–4 Big Sky)
- Head coach: Bud Hake (1st season)
- Home stadium: ASISU Minidome

1977 Big Sky Conference football standings
	Conf.					Overall
Team	W		L		T	W		L		T
No. T–5 Boise State $	6	–	0	–	0	9	–	2	–	0
No. T–5 Northern Arizona ^	5	–	1	–	0	9	–	3	–	0
Montana State	3	–	3	–	0	6	–	4	–	0
Weber State	2	–	4	–	0	4	–	6	–	0
Idaho State	2	–	4	–	0	3	–	8	–	0
Idaho	2	–	4	–	0	3	–	8	–	0
Montana	1	–	5	–	0	4	–	6	–	0
$ – Conference champion; ^ – NCAA Division II playoff participant; Boise State concluded its regular season after the NCAA Division II playoffs started; runner-up Northern Arizona was awarded playoff bid.; Rankings from NCAA Division II AP Poll

The 1977 Idaho State Bengals football team represented Idaho State University as a member of the Big Sky Conference during the 1977 NCAA Division II football season. Led by first-year head coach Bud Hake, the Bengals compiled an overall record of 3–8, with a mark of 2–4 in conference play, and finished tied for fourth in the Big Sky.

== Schedule ==
Date	Opponent	Site	Result	Attendance	Source
September 10	Northern Arizona	ASISU Minidome; Pocatello, ID	L 7–28	7,200	
September 17	at Nevada*	Mackay Stadium; Reno, NV	L 0–35	8,100	
September 24	Eastern Montana*	ASISU Minidome; Pocatello, ID	W 47–15	6,600	
October 1	at Portland State*	Civic Stadium; Portland, OR	L 0–47	5,580	
October 8	at Idaho	Kibbie Dome; Moscow, ID (rivalry)	W 34–14	11,500	
October 15	at No. 4 Montana State	Reno H. Sales Stadium; Bozeman, MT	L 0–31	8,777	
October 22	at Montana	Dornblaser Field; Missoula, MT	L 15–17	5,500	
October 29	at Fresno State*	Ratcliffe Stadium; Fresno, CA	L 7–28	12,761–13,923	
November 5	at No. 8 Boise State	Bronco Stadium; Boise, ID	L 7–31	19,850	
November 12	Weber State	ASISU Minidome; Pocatello, ID	W 21–18	5,090	
November 19	Utah State*	ASISU Minidome; Pocatello, ID	L 7–35	6,250	
*Non-conference game; Rankings from AP Poll released prior to the game
