= 1976 Long Beach State 49ers football team =

American college football season

1976 Long Beach State 49ers football
- Conference: Pacific Coast Athletic Association
- Record: 8–3 (2–2 PCAA)
- Head coach: Wayne Howard (3rd season)
- Offensive coordinator: Ron McBride (3rd season)
- Defensive coordinator: Tom Gadd (3rd season)
- Home stadium: Veterans Stadium

1976 Pacific Coast Athletic Association football standings
	Conf.					Overall
Team	W		L		T	W		L		T
San Jose State $	4	–	0	–	0	7	–	4	–	0
Fresno State	3	–	1	–	0	5	–	6	–	0
Long Beach State	2	–	2	–	0	8	–	3	–	0
Cal State Fullerton	1	–	3	–	0	3	–	7	–	1
Pacific (CA)	0	–	4	–	0	2	–	9	–	0
$ – Conference champion

The 1976 Long Beach State 49ers football team represented California State University, Long Beach (Note: The official name of Long Beach State has been California State University, Long Beach since 1972. However, it is still commonly known as Long Beach State.) during the 1976 NCAA Division I football season.

Cal State Long Beach competed in the Pacific Coast Athletic Association. (Note: The Big West Conference was known as the Pacific Coast Athletic Association from its founding in 1969 through 1987.) The team was led by third year head coach Wayne Howard, and played home games at Veterans Stadium adjacent to the campus of Long Beach City College in Long Beach, California. They finished the season with a record of eight wins, three losses (8–3, 2–2 PCAA).

== Schedule ==
Date	Opponent	Site	Result	Attendance	Source
September 11	Weber State*	Veterans Memorial Stadium; Long Beach, CA	W 19–7	5,700	
September 18	at Utah State*	Romney Stadium; Logan, UT	W 32–10	7,173	
September 25	Northern Illinois*	Veterans Memorial Stadium; Long Beach, CA	W 37–0	7,747	
October 2	at Pacific (CA)	Pacific Memorial Stadium; Stockton, CA	W 17–14	7,318	
October 9	Drake*	Veterans Memorial Stadium; Long Beach, CA	W 41–10	10,200	
October 16	at San Jose State	Spartan Stadium; San Jose, CA	L 7–34	18,500	
October 23	at Lamar*	Cardinal Stadium; Beaumont, TX	W 21–10	7,098	
October 30	at Wichita State*	Cessna Stadium; Wichita, KS	W 24–14	8,431	
November 6	at Fresno State	Ratcliffe Stadium; Fresno, CA	L 0–23	11,100	
November 13	at Cal State Fullerton	Santa Ana Stadium; Santa Ana, CA	W 28–8	12,500	
November 20	San Diego State*	Veterans Memorial Stadium; Long Beach, CA	L 3–10	14,900	
*Non-conference game

== Team players in the NFL ==
The following were selected in the 1977 NFL draft.

Player	Position	Round	Overall	NFL team
Mark Bailey	Running back	4	92	Kansas City Chiefs
