= 1976 Montana State Bobcats football team =

American college football season

1976 Montana State Bobcats football

NCAA Division II champion Big Sky champion

NCAA Division II Championship—Pioneer Bowl, W 24–13 vs. Akron
- Conference: Big Sky Conference
- Record: 12–1 (6–0 Big Sky)
- Head coach: Sonny Holland (6th season)
- Offensive coordinator: Don Christensen (6th season)
- Defensive coordinator: Sonny Lubick (6th season)
- Home stadium: Reno H. Sales Stadium

1976 Big Sky Conference football standings
	Conf.					Overall
Team	W		L		T	W		L		T
No. 1 Montana State $^	6	–	0	–	0	12	–	1	–	0
Idaho	5	–	1	–	0	7	–	4	–	0
Northern Arizona	4	–	2	–	0	8	–	3	–	0
Montana	3	–	3	–	0	4	–	6	–	0
Boise State	2	–	4	–	0	5	–	5	–	1
Weber State	1	–	5	–	0	2	–	9	–	0
Idaho State	0	–	6	–	0	1	–	9	–	0
$ – Conference champion; ^ – NCAA Division II playoff participant; Rankings from NCAA Division II AP Poll

The 1976 Montana State Bobcats football team represented the Montana State University in the 1976 NCAA Division II football season. The team was led by sixth-year head coach Sonny Holland and won the Division II national championship. The Bobcats played their home games on campus in Bozeman at Reno H. Sales Stadium.

Entering August practices, the Bobcats were expected to finish in the middle of the conference standings. Led on the field by southpaw sophomore quarterback Paul Dennehy, Montana State went undefeated in the Big Sky and against all Division II opponents, falling only to Fresno State of Division I. Montana State finished their schedule with a 28–7 victory at Hawaii to end the regular season at 9–1.

In the Division II playoffs, the Bobcats hosted New Hampshire in Bozeman in the quarterfinals and won by a point, 17–16. In the semifinals at Fargo, MSU defeated North Dakota State for a second time in 1976, by a much closer 10–3 score in the Grantland Rice Bowl.

In the Pioneer Bowl for the Division II title in Wichita Falls, Texas, the Bobcats defeated Akron 24–13 and became the first Big Sky team to win a national title in football. the Bobcats went undefeated in the Big Sky and won the Division II national championship.

== Schedule ==
Date	Opponent	Rank	Site	Result	Attendance	Source
September 11	at North Dakota*		Memorial Stadium; Grand Forks, ND	W 18–14	12,800	
September 18	North Dakota State*		Reno H. Sales Stadium; Bozeman, MT	W 34–7	2,300	
September 25	at Fresno State*	No. 3	Ratcliffe Stadium; Fresno, CA	L 10–24	11,500	
October 2	Boise State		Reno H. Sales Stadium; Bozeman, MT	W 24–20	7,800	
October 9	at Weber State		Wildcat Stadium; Ogden, UT	W 44–0	7,422	
October 16	Idaho State	No. 8	Reno H. Sales Stadium; Bozeman, MT	W 28–7	9,600	
October 23	Idaho	No. 7	Reno H. Sales Stadium; Bozeman, MT	W 29–14	5,400	
October 30	at Montana	No. 4	Dornblaser Field; Missoula, MT (rivalry)	W 21–12	12,500	
November 6	No. 6 Northern Arizona	No. 3	Reno H. Sales Stadium; Bozeman, MT	W 33–0	9,400	
November 13	at Hawaii*	No. 3	Aloha Stadium; Halawa, HI	W 28–7	20,515	
November 27	No. T–8 New Hampshire*	No. 1	Reno H. Sales Stadium; Bozeman, MT (NCAA Division II Quarterfinal)	W 17–16	6,900	
December 4	at No. T–8 North Dakota State*	No. 1	Dacotah Field; Fargo, ND (Grantland Rice Bowl—NCAA Division II Semifinal)	W 10–3	6,100	
December 11	vs. No. 3 Akron*	No. 1	Memorial Stadium; Wichita Falls, TX (Pioneer Bowl—NCAA Division II Championship)	W 24–13	13,200	
*Non-conference game; Rankings from AP Poll released prior to the game
