= Lynn Stiles =

American football player, coach, and executive (born 1941)

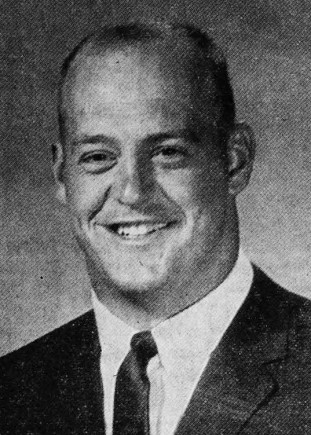
- Stiles, circa 1962

Biographical details
- Born: April 12, 1941; Kermit, Texas, U.S.
- Died: June 24, 2026 (aged 85)

Playing career
- 1961–1962: Utah
- Positions: Guard, center, linebacker

Coaching career (HC unless noted)
- 1963–1964: Utah (assistant)
- 1965–1970: Iowa (assistant)
- 1971–1973: UCLA (LB/DL)
- 1974–1975: UCLA (DC)
- 1976–1978: San Jose State
- 1979–1986: Philadelphia Eagles (assistant)
- 1987–1991: San Francisco 49ers (assistant)
- 1998–1999: St. Louis Rams (TE)

Administrative career (AD unless noted)
- 1992–1996: Kansas City Chiefs (VP player pers.)
- 1997–1999: St. Louis Rams (VP football ops)
- 2000–2008: Kansas City Chiefs (VP football ops)

Head coaching record
- Overall: 18–16

Accomplishments and honors

Championships
- 2 PCAA (1976, 1978)

Lynn George Stiles (April 12, 1941 – June 24, 2026) was an American football player, coach, and executive. He served as the head football coach at San Jose State University from 1976 to 1978, compiling a record of 18–16. Stiles was later an assistant coach with the Philadelphia Eagles, San Francisco 49ers and St. Louis Rams of the National Football League (NFL). From 1992 to 1996, he served in the front office for the Kansas City Chiefs as vice president of player personnel.

Stiles played college football at the University of Utah as a guard, center, and linebacker. He died on June 24, 2026.

== Head coaching record ==
Year	Team	Overall	Conference	Standing	Bowl/playoffs
San Jose State Spartans (Pacific Coast Athletic Association) (1976–1978)
1976	San Jose State	7–4	4–0	1st	
1977	San Jose State	4–7	2–2	3rd	
1978	San Jose State	7–5	4–1	1st	
San Jose State:		18–16	10–3		
Total:		18–16			
