= 1977 Long Beach State 49ers football team =

American college football season

1977 Long Beach State 49ers football
- Conference: Pacific Coast Athletic Association
- Record: 4–6 (1–3 PCAA)
- Head coach: Dave Currey (1st season)
- Offensive coordinator: Ron McBride (1st season)
- Home stadium: Veterans Stadium; Anaheim Stadium

1977 Pacific Coast Athletic Association football standings
	Conf.					Overall
Team	W		L		T	W		L		T
Fresno State $	4	–	0	–	0	9	–	2	–	0
Pacific (CA)	3	–	1	–	0	6	–	5	–	0
San Jose State	2	–	2	–	0	4	–	7	–	0
Long Beach State	1	–	3	–	0	4	–	6	–	0
Cal State Fullerton	0	–	4	–	0	4	–	7	–	0
$ – Conference champion

The 1977 Long Beach State 49ers football team represented California State University, Long Beach (Note: The official name of Long Beach State has been California State University, Long Beach since 1972. However, it is still commonly known as Long Beach State.) during the 1977 NCAA Division I football season.

Cal State Long Beach competed in the Pacific Coast Athletic Association. (Note: The Big West Conference was known as the Pacific Coast Athletic Association from its founding in 1969 through 1987.) The team was led by first year head coach Dave Currey, and played the majority of their home games at Anaheim Stadium in Anaheim, California. One game was still played at Veterans Stadium adjacent to the campus of Long Beach City College in Long Beach, California. They finished the season with a record of four wins, six losses (4–6, 1–3 PCAA).

== Schedule ==
Date	Time	Opponent	Site	Result	Attendance	Source
September 16	7:30 pm	at Cal State Fullerton*	Falcon Stadium; Norwalk, CA	W 50–31	7,831	
September 24	1:30 pm	Lamar*	Veterans Memorial Stadium; Long Beach, CA	W 21–7	5,444	
October 1	11:30 am	at Drake*	Drake Stadium; Des Moines, IA	W 27–10	6,380	
October 15	7:30 pm	San Jose State	Anaheim Stadium; Anaheim, CA	L 16–33	10,430	
October 22	7:30 pm	Pacific (CA)*	Anaheim Stadium; Anaheim, CA	L 7–22	8,963	
October 29	11:30 am	at Wichita State	Cessna Stadium; Wichita, KS	L 21–35	11,623	
November 5	7:30 pm	Fresno State*	Anaheim Stadium; Anaheim, CA	L 14–23	5,951	
November 12	7:30 pm	at San Diego State*	San Diego Stadium; San Diego, CA	L 22–33	37,213	
November 19	12:30 pm	at No. 17 BYU	Cougar Stadium; Provo, UT	L 27–30	21,322	
November 26	7:30 pm	Bowling Green	Anaheim Stadium; Anaheim, CA	W 29–28	5,228	
*Non-conference game; Rankings from AP Poll released prior to the game; All times are in Pacific time

== Team players in the NFL ==
The following were selected in the 1978 NFL draft.

Player	Position	Round	Overall	NFL team
Dan Bunz	Linebacker	1	24	San Francisco 49ers
