= 1977 Cal State Los Angeles Diablos football team =

American college football season

1977 Cal State Los Angeles Diablos football
- Conference: California Collegiate Athletic Association
- Record: 4–5 (0–0 CCAA)
- Head coach: Ron Hull (2nd season)
- Home stadium: Campus Field

1977 California Collegiate Athletic Association football standings
	Conf.					Overall
Team	W		L		T	W		L		T
Cal Poly $	2	–	0	–	0	6	–	4	–	0
Cal State Northridge	1	–	1	–	0	7	–	3	–	1
Cal Poly Pomona	0	–	2	–	0	2	–	8	–	0
Cal State Los Angeles	0	–	0	–	0	4	–	5	–	0
$ – Conference champion

The 1977 Cal State Los Angeles Diablos football team represented California State University, Los Angeles during the 1977 NCAA Division II football season. Led by second-year head coach Ron Hull, Cal State Los Angeles compiled a record of 4–5 and was outscored by its opponents 123 to 93 for the season. The Diablos were members of the California Collegiate Athletic Association (CCAA), but did not play against games against conference opponents. The team played home games at Campus Field in Los Angeles.

Cal State discontinued its football program after the season. In 27 seasons, the Cal State Los Angeles Diablos football program compiled an overall record of 102–139–10.

== Schedule ==
Date	Opponent	Site	Result	Attendance	Source
September 10	United States International*	Campus Field; Los Angeles, CA	W 24–6	2,000	
September 17	Southern Utah State*	Campus Field; Los Angeles, CA	L 12–27	3,500	
September 24	at Cal State Hayward*	Pioneer Stadium; Hayward, CA	L 7–38	2,000	
October 1	at Sacramento State*	Hornet Stadium; Sacramento, CA	W 13–10	1,500–4,000	
October 8	Cal State Northridge*	Campus Field; Los Angeles, CA	L 6–7	2,000–3,000	
October 22	Cal Lutheran*	Campus Field; Los Angeles, CA	L 6–14	3,500	
October 29	San Diego*	Campus Field; Los Angeles, CA	W 9–0	1,000–1,500	
November 5	at Azusa Pacific*	Azusa, CA	W 10–0	500	
November 12	San Francisco State*	Campus Field; Los Angeles, CA	L 6–21	4,000	
*Non-conference game
