= 1977 San Jose State Spartans football team =

American college football season

1977 San Jose State Spartans football
- Conference: Pacific Coast Athletic Association
- Record: 4–7 (2–2 PCAA)
- Head coach: Lynn Stiles (2nd season)
- Offensive coordinator: Pete Kettela (1st season)
- Home stadium: Spartan Stadium

1977 Pacific Coast Athletic Association football standings
	Conf.					Overall
Team	W		L		T	W		L		T
Fresno State $	4	–	0	–	0	9	–	2	–	0
Pacific (CA)	3	–	1	–	0	6	–	5	–	0
San Jose State	2	–	2	–	0	4	–	7	–	0
Long Beach State	1	–	3	–	0	4	–	6	–	0
Cal State Fullerton	0	–	4	–	0	4	–	7	–	0
$ – Conference champion

The 1977 San Jose State Spartans football team represented San Jose State University during the 1977 NCAA Division I football season as a member of the Pacific Coast Athletic Association. (Note: The Big West Conference was known as the Pacific Coast Athletic Association from its founding in 1969 through 1987.) The team was led by second year head coach Lynn Stiles. They played home games at Spartan Stadium in San Jose, California. The Spartans finished the season with a record of four wins and seven losses (4–7, 2–2 PCAA).

== Schedule ==
Date	Opponent	Site	TV	Result	Attendance	Source
September 10	at Utah State*	Romney Stadium; Logan, UT		L 10–22	13,870	
September 17	at Washington*	Husky Stadium; Seattle, WA		L 3–24	36,489	
September 24	Cal State Fullerton	Spartan Stadium; San Jose, CA		W 23–12	13,500	
October 1	at No. 17 California*	California Memorial Stadium; Berkeley, CA		L 3–52	35,275	
October 8	Santa Clara*	Spartan Stadium; San Jose, CA		W 44–22	17,316	
October 15	at Long Beach State	Anaheim Stadium; Anaheim, CA		W 33–16	10,430	
October 22	at Fresno State	Ratcliffe Stadium; Fresno, CA (rivalry)		L 24–45	15,401	
October 29	Pacific (CA)^{†}	Spartan Stadium; San Jose, CA (Victory Bell)		L 7–24	11,906	
November 5	Hawaii*	Spartan Stadium; San Jose, CA (rivalry)		W 24–14	8,145	
November 12	at Stanford*	Stanford Stadium; Stanford, CA (rivalry)		L 26–31	39,000	
December 3	No. 16 San Diego State*	Spartan Stadium; San Jose, CA	ABC	L 34–37	10,000	
*Non-conference game; ^{†}Homecoming; Rankings from AP Poll released prior to the game

== Team players in the NFL ==
The following were selected in the 1978 NFL draft.

Player	Position	Round	Overall	NFL team
Gerald Small	Defensive back	4	93	Miami Dolphins
Randy Gill	Linebacker	10	265	St. Louis Cardinals

The following finished their San Jose State career in 1977, were not drafted, but played in the NFL.

Player	Position	First NFL team
Dwayne O'Steen	Defensive back	1978 Los Angeles Rams
