= 1976 Chico State Wildcats football team =

American college football season

1976 Chico State Wildcats football
- Conference: Far Western Conference
- Record: 5–6 (2–3 FWC)
- Head coach: Dick Trimmer (3rd season)
- Home stadium: University Stadium

1976 Far Western Conference football standings
	Conf.					Overall
Team	W		L		T	W		L		T
UC Davis $	5	–	0	–	0	8	–	2	–	0
Humboldt State	4	–	1	–	0	5	–	5	–	0
Chico State	2	–	3	–	0	5	–	6	–	0
San Francisco State	2	–	3	–	0	4	–	7	–	0
Sacramento State	2	–	3	–	0	2	–	8	–	0
Cal State Hayward	0	–	5	–	0	1	–	8	–	1
$ – Conference champion

The 1976 Chico State Wildcats football team represented California State University, Chico as a member of the Far Western Conference (FWC) during the 1976 NCAA Division II football season. Led by third-year head coach Dick Trimmer, Chico State compiled an overall record of 5–6 with a mark of 2–3 in conference play, placing in a three-way tied for third in the FWC. The team was outscored by its opponents 249 to 187 for the season. The Wildcats played home games at University Stadium in Chico, California.

== Schedule ==
Date	Opponent	Site	Result	Attendance	Source
September 11	at Portland State*	Civic Stadium; Portland, OR	L 3–50	7,528	
September 18	Central Washington*	University Stadium; Chico, CA	W 36–14	4,258	
September 25	at Simon Fraser*	Thunderbird Stadium; University Endowment Lands, BC	L 6–20		
October 2	Western Montana*	University Stadium; Chico, CA	W 51–10	3,289	
October 9	UC Davis	University Stadium; Chico, CA	L 6–26	5,500–5,580	
October 15	at San Francisco State	Cox Stadium; San Francisco, CA	W 16–10	500–1,500	
October 23	Puget Sound*	University Stadium; Chico, CA	W 16–15	4,289	
October 30	at Nevada*	Mackay Stadium; Reno, NV	L 14–43	3,600–5,600	
November 6	Cal State Hayward	University Stadium; Chico, CA	W 14–13	2,489–3,000	
November 13	at Sacramento State	Hornet Stadium; Sacramento, CA	L 5–19	550	
November 20	at Humboldt State	Redwood Bowl; Arcata, CA	L 20–29	3,500	
*Non-conference game
