= 1977 Cal State Northridge Matadors football team =

American college football season

1977 Cal State Northridge Matadors football
- Conference: California Collegiate Athletic Association
- Record: 7–3–1 (1–1 CCAA)
- Head coach: Jack Elway (2nd season)
- Home stadium: North Campus Stadium

1977 California Collegiate Athletic Association football standings
	Conf.					Overall
Team	W		L		T	W		L		T
Cal Poly $	2	–	0	–	0	6	–	4	–	0
Cal State Northridge	1	–	1	–	0	7	–	3	–	1
Cal Poly Pomona	0	–	2	–	0	2	–	8	–	0
Cal State Los Angeles	0	–	0	–	0	4	–	5	–	0
$ – Conference champion

The 1977 Cal State Northridge Matadors football team represented California State University, Northridge as a member of the California Collegiate Athletic Association (CCAA) during the 1977 NCAA Division II football season. Led by second-year Jack Elway head coach, Cal State Northridge compiled an overall record of 7–3–1 with a mark of 1–1 in conference play, placing second in the CCAA. The team outscored its opponents 264 to 179 for the season. The Matadors played home games at North Campus Stadium in Northridge, California.

== Schedule ==
Date	Opponent	Site	Result	Attendance	Source
September 10	San Francisco State*	North Campus Stadium; Northridge, CA	W 17–10	2,700–5,000	
September 17	at Cal State Hayward*	Pioneer Stadium; Hayward, CA	L 3–13		
September 24	at No. T–9 Nevada*	Mackay Stadium; Reno, NV	W 22–19	7,110	
October 1	at Cal State Fullerton*	Falcon Stadium; Norwalk, CA	L 14–45	2,214	
October 8	at Cal State Los Angeles*	Campus Field; Los Angeles, CA	W 7–6	2,000–3,000	
October 15	San Diego*	North Campus Stadium; Northridge, CA	W 56–20		
October 29	at Cal Poly Pomona	Kellogg Field; Pomona, CA	W 19–0	2,500	
November 5	Cal Poly	North Campus Stadium; Northridge, CA	L 14–42	4,500	
November 12	United States International*	North Campus Stadium; Northridge, CA	W 52–0	5,203	
November 19	at Sacramento State*	Hornet Stadium; Sacramento, CA	W 36–0	2,500	
November 23	Santa Clara*	North Campus Stadium; Northridge, CA	T 24–24	3,000	
*Non-conference game; Rankings from Associated Press Poll released prior to the game

== Team players in the NFL ==
No Cal State Northridge players were selected in the 1978 NFL draft.

The following finished their college career in 1977, were not drafted, but played in the NFL.

Player	Position	First NFL team
Lon Boyett	TE	1978 San Francisco 49ers
