= 1976 Cal State Northridge Matadors football team =

American college football season

1976 Cal State Northridge Matadors football
- Conference: California Collegiate Athletic Association
- Record: 8–3 (1–2 CCAA)
- Head coach: Jack Elway (1st season)
- Home stadium: North Campus Stadium

1976 California Collegiate Athletic Association football standings
	Conf.					Overall
Team	W		L		T	W		L		T
Cal Poly $	2	–	0	–	0	7	–	1	–	1
Cal Poly Pomona	1	–	1	–	0	4	–	5	–	1
Cal State Northridge	1	–	2	–	0	8	–	3	–	0
Cal State Los Angeles	0	–	1	–	0	5	–	3	–	1
$ – Conference champion

The 1976 Cal State Northridge Matadors football team represented California State University, Northridge as a member of the California Collegiate Athletic Association (CCAA) during the 1976 NCAA Division II football season. Led by first-year Jack Elway head coach, Cal State Northridge compiled an overall record of 8–3 with a mark of 1–2 in conference play, placing third the CCAA. The team outscored its opponents 217 to 137 for the season. The Matadors played home games at North Campus Stadium in Northridge, California.

== Schedule ==
Date	Opponent	Site	Result	Attendance	Source
September 10	at San Francisco State*	Cox Stadium; San Francisco, CA	W 14–9	1,200	
September 18	at Cal Lutheran*	Mt. Clef Field; Thousand Oaks, CA	W 26–14	4,500	
September 25	UC Davis*	North Campus Stadium; Northridge, CA	W 17–3	3,000–3,500	
October 2	at Cal Poly	Mustang Stadium; San Luis Obispo, CA	L 7–19	7,350	
October 9	Cal State Los Angeles	North Campus Stadium; Northridge, CA	W 24–13	3,000–3,500	
October 16	at San Diego*	Torero Stadium; San Diego, CA	W 49–6	2,100	
October 23	at Santa Clara*	Buck Shaw Stadium; Santa Clara, CA	L 7–33	7,220	
October 30	Cal State Hayward*	North Campus Stadium; Northridge, CA	W 23–10	3,500–4,500	
November 6	Cal Poly Pomona	North Campus Stadium; Northridge, CA	L 7–20	3,500	
November 13	at United States International*	Balboa Stadium?; San Diego, CA	W 27–0	500	
November 20	Cal State Fullerton*	North Campus Stadium; Northridge, CA	W 16–10	4,000	
*Non-conference game
