= 1976 Cal State Hayward Pioneers football team =

American college football season

1976 Cal State Hayward Pioneers football
- Conference: Far Western Conference
- Record: 1–8–1 (0–5 FWC)
- Head coach: Tim Tierney (2nd season)
- Home stadium: Pioneer Stadium

1976 Far Western Conference football standings
	Conf.					Overall
Team	W		L		T	W		L		T
UC Davis $	5	–	0	–	0	8	–	2	–	0
Humboldt State	4	–	1	–	0	5	–	5	–	0
Chico State	2	–	3	–	0	5	–	6	–	0
San Francisco State	2	–	3	–	0	4	–	7	–	0
Sacramento State	2	–	3	–	0	2	–	8	–	0
Cal State Hayward	0	–	5	–	0	1	–	8	–	1
$ – Conference champion

The 1976 Cal State Hayward Pioneers football team represented California State University, Hayward—now known as California State University, East Bay—as a member of the Far Western Conference (FWC) during the 1976 NCAA Division II football season. Led by second-year head coach Tim Tierney, Cal State Hayward compiled an overall record of 0–10 with a mark of 1–8–1 in conference play, placing last out of six teams in the FWC. The team was outscored by its opponents 223 to 171 for the season. The Pioneers played home games at Pioneer Stadium in Hayward, California.

== Schedule ==
Date	Opponent	Site	Result	Attendance	Source
September 11	at Nevada*	Mackay Stadium; Reno, NV	L 13–30	5,300–5,400	
September 25	Santa Clara*	Pioneer Stadium; Hayward, CA	L 19–45	1,500	
October 2	Saint Mary's*	Pioneer Stadium; Hayward, CA	W 30–3	1,500	
October 9	at Humboldt State	Redwood Bowl; Arcata, CA	L 10–14	2,500	
October 16	at UC Davis	Toomey Field; Davis, CA	L 14–25	5,700–7,050	
October 23	San Francisco State	Pioneer Stadium; Hayward, CA	L 17–21	1,500	
October 30	at Cal State Northridge*	North Campus Stadium; Northridge, CA	L 10–23	3,500–4,500	
November 6	at Chico State	University Stadium; Chico, CA	L 13–14	2,489–3,000	
November 13	at Cal State Los Angeles*	Campus Field; Los Angeles, CA	T 21–21	1,500–2,500	
November 20	Sacramento State	Pioneer Stadium; Hayward, CA	L 24–27	1,000	
*Non-conference game
