= 1977 Montana State Bobcats football team =

American college football season

1977 Montana State Bobcats football
- Conference: Big Sky Conference
- Record: 6–4 (3–3 Big Sky)
- Head coach: Sonny Holland (7th season)
- Defensive coordinator: Sonny Lubick (7th season)
- Home stadium: Sales Stadium

1977 Big Sky Conference football standings
	Conf.					Overall
Team	W		L		T	W		L		T
No. T–5 Boise State $	6	–	0	–	0	9	–	2	–	0
No. T–5 Northern Arizona ^	5	–	1	–	0	9	–	3	–	0
Montana State	3	–	3	–	0	6	–	4	–	0
Weber State	2	–	4	–	0	4	–	6	–	0
Idaho State	2	–	4	–	0	3	–	8	–	0
Idaho	2	–	4	–	0	3	–	8	–	0
Montana	1	–	5	–	0	4	–	6	–	0
$ – Conference champion; ^ – NCAA Division II playoff participant; Boise State concluded its regular season after the NCAA Division II playoffs started; runner-up Northern Arizona was awarded playoff bid.; Rankings from NCAA Division II AP Poll

The 1977 Montana State Bobcats football team was an American football team that represented Montana State University in the Big Sky Conference during the 1977 NCAA Division II football season. In their seventh and final season under head coach Sonny Holland, the Bobcats compiled a 6–4 record (3–3 against Big Sky opponents) and finished third in the Big Sky.

== Schedule ==
Date	Opponent	Rank	Site	Result	Attendance	Source
September 10	North Dakota*		Sales Stadium; Bozeman, MT	W 21–7	6,850	
September 17	at North Dakota State*		Dacotah Field; Fargo, ND	W 24–17	12,100	
September 24	Fresno State*	No. 1	Sales Stadium; Bozeman, MT	W 24–14	10,100	
October 1	at Boise State	No. 1	Bronco Stadium; Boise, ID	L 0–26	20,552	
October 8	Weber State^{†}	No. 5	Sales Stadium; Bozeman, MT	W 27–24	10,000	
October 15	at Idaho State	No. 4	ASISU Minidome; Pocatello, ID	W 31–0	8,777	
October 22	Idaho	No. 3	Kibbie Dome; Moscow, ID	L 6–17	8,750	
October 29	Montana		Sales Stadium; Bozeman, MT (rivalry)	W 24–19	15,050	
November 5	at Northern Arizona		NAU Ensphere; Flagstaff, AZ	L 21–28	14,216	
November 19	at Portland State*		Civic Stadium; Portland, OR	L 35–56	4,624	
*Non-conference game; ^{†}Homecoming; Rankings from AP Poll released prior to the game
