= 1977 Cal State Fullerton Titans football team =

American college football season

1977 Cal State Fullerton Titans football
- Conference: Pacific Coast Athletic Association
- Record: 4–7 (0–4 PCAA)
- Head coach: Jim Colletto (3rd season)
- Defensive coordinator: Larry Welsh (2nd season)
- Home stadium: Falcon Stadium

1977 Pacific Coast Athletic Association football standings
	Conf.					Overall
Team	W		L		T	W		L		T
Fresno State $	4	–	0	–	0	9	–	2	–	0
Pacific (CA)	3	–	1	–	0	6	–	5	–	0
San Jose State	2	–	2	–	0	4	–	7	–	0
Long Beach State	1	–	3	–	0	4	–	6	–	0
Cal State Fullerton	0	–	4	–	0	4	–	7	–	0
$ – Conference champion

The 1977 Cal State Fullerton Titans football team represented California State University, Fullerton as a member of the Pacific Coast Athletic Association (PCAA) during the 1977 NCAA Division I football season. Led by third-year head coach Jim Colletto, Cal State Fullerton compiled an overall record 4–7 with a mark of 0–4 in conference play, placing last out of five teams in the PCAA. The Titans played home games at Falcon Stadium on the campus of Cerritos College in Norwalk, California.

== Schedule ==
Date	Opponent	Site	Result	Attendance	Source
September 10	at San Diego State*	San Diego Stadium; San Diego, CA	L 17–34	41,066	
September 16	Long Beach State	Falcon Stadium; Norwalk, CA	L 31–50	7,831	
September 24	at San Jose State	Spartan Stadium; San Jose, CA	L 12–23	13,500	
October 1	Cal State Northridge*	Falcon Stadium; Norwalk, CA	W 45–14	2,214	
October 8	at Northeast Louisiana*	Brown Stadium; Monroe, LA	W 31–10	6,000	
October 15	at Northern Arizona*	NAU Skydome (Note: This was the first game played in the new NAU Skydome.); Flagstaff, AZ	L 9–24	15,988	
October 22	Cal Poly*	Falcon Stadium; Norwalk, CA	W 45–18	2,613	
October 29	at UNLV*	Las Vegas Stadium; Whitney, NV	L 21–24	11,663	
November 5	Cal Poly Pomona*	Falcon Stadium; Norwalk, CA	W 48–0	1,614	
November 11	Fresno State	Falcon Stadium; Norwalk, CA	L 19–44	5,250	
November 19	at Pacific (CA)	Pacific Memorial Stadium; Stockton, CA	L 7–49	6,952	
*Non-conference game
