= 1977 Pacific Tigers football team =

American college football season

1977 Pacific Tigers football
- Conference: Pacific Coast Athletic Association
- Record: 6–5 (3–1 PCAA)
- Head coach: Chester Caddas (6th season)
- Home stadium: Pacific Memorial Stadium

1977 Pacific Coast Athletic Association football standings
	Conf.					Overall
Team	W		L		T	W		L		T
Fresno State $	4	–	0	–	0	9	–	2	–	0
Pacific (CA)	3	–	1	–	0	6	–	5	–	0
San Jose State	2	–	2	–	0	4	–	7	–	0
Long Beach State	1	–	3	–	0	4	–	6	–	0
Cal State Fullerton	0	–	4	–	0	4	–	7	–	0
$ – Conference champion

The 1977 Pacific Tigers football team represented the University of the Pacific (UOP) in the 1977 NCAA Division I football season as a member of the Pacific Coast Athletic Association. (Note: The Big West Conference was known as the Pacific Coast Athletic Association from its founding in 1969 through 1987.)

The team was led by head coach Chester Caddas, in his sixth year, and played their home games at Pacific Memorial Stadium (Note: Amos Alonzo Stagg Memorial Stadium was known as Pacific Memorial Stadium from its opening in 1950 through 1987.) in Stockton, California. They finished the season with a record of six wins and five losses (6–5, 3–1 PCAA). The Tigers outscored their opponents 230–161 over the season.

== Schedule ==
Date	Opponent	Site	Result	Attendance	Source
September 10	Colorado State*	Pacific Memorial Stadium; Stockton, CA	L 3–20	14,682	
September 17	at Idaho*	Kibbie Dome; Moscow, ID	W 31–21	12,000	
September 24	at Air Force*	Falcon Stadium; Colorado Springs, CO	L 13–15	24,783	
October 1	at Miami (FL)*	Miami Orange Bowl; Miami, FL	L 3–24	33,608	
October 8	Hawaii*	Pacific Memorial Stadium; Stockton, CA	W 37–7	10,364	
October 15	Fresno State^{†}	Pacific Memorial Stadium; Stockton, CA	L 10–24	13,740	
October 22	at Long Beach State	Anaheim Stadium; Anaheim, CA	W 22–7	8,963	
October 29	at San Jose State	Spartan Stadium; San Jose, CA (Victory Bell)	W 24–7	11,906	
November 5	San Diego State*	Pacific Memorial Stadium; Stockton, CA	L 7–29	9,857	
November 12	Northeast Louisiana*	Pacific Memorial Stadium; Stockton, CA	W 31–0		
November 19	Cal State Fullerton	Pacific Memorial Stadium; Stockton, CA	W 49–7	6,952	
*Non-conference game; ^{†}Homecoming

== Team players in the NFL ==
The following UOP players were selected in the 1978 NFL draft.

Player	Position	Round	Overall	NFL team
Bruce Gibson	Running back	7	177	Detroit Lions
Joe Conron	Wide receiver	12	332	Oakland Raiders

The following finished their college career in 1977, were not drafted, but played in the NFL.

Player	Position	First NFL team
Brian Peets	Tight end	1978 Seattle Seahawks
