= 1976 Boise State Broncos football team =

American college football season

1976 Boise State Broncos football
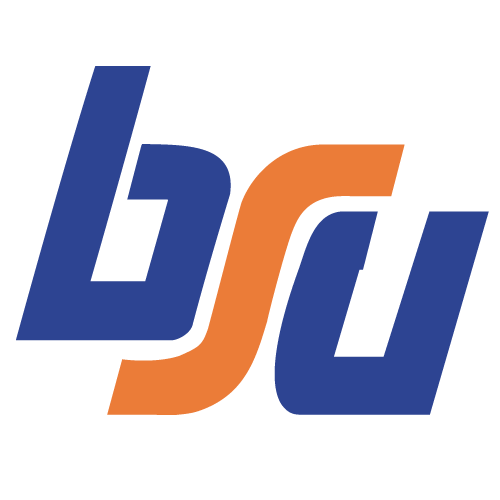
- Conference: Big Sky Conference
- Record: 5–5–1 (2–4 Big Sky)
- Head coach: Jim Criner (1st season)
- Offensive coordinator: Rod Dowhower (1st season)
- Defensive coordinator: Bill Dutton (1st season)
- Home stadium: Bronco Stadium

1976 Big Sky Conference football standings
	Conf.					Overall
Team	W		L		T	W		L		T
No. 1 Montana State $^	6	–	0	–	0	12	–	1	–	0
Idaho	5	–	1	–	0	7	–	4	–	0
Northern Arizona	4	–	2	–	0	8	–	3	–	0
Montana	3	–	3	–	0	4	–	6	–	0
Boise State	2	–	4	–	0	5	–	5	–	1
Weber State	1	–	5	–	0	2	–	9	–	0
Idaho State	0	–	6	–	0	1	–	9	–	0
$ – Conference champion; ^ – NCAA Division II playoff participant; Rankings from NCAA Division II AP Poll

The 1976 Boise State Broncos football team represented Boise State University in the 1976 NCAA Division II football season. The Broncos competed in the Big Sky Conference and played their home games on campus at Bronco Stadium in Boise, Idaho. Led by first-year head coach Jim Criner, the Broncos were 5–5–1 overall and 2–4 in conference.

Boise State entered the season as three-time defending Big Sky champions, but under a new head coach. After leading the Broncos for eight seasons, 61-year-old Tony Knap moved south to Nevada-Las Vegas in late January to replace Ron Meyer, who went to SMU in Dallas. Hired two weeks later in mid-February, Criner was previously the linebackers coach at UCLA under head coach Dick Vermeil; the Bruins were Pac-8 champions in 1975 and won the Rose Bowl, a 23–10 upset of undefeated and top-ranked Ohio State.

== Schedule ==
Date	Time	Opponent	Site	Result	Attendance	Source
September 11	7:30 pm	Idaho	Bronco Stadium; Boise, ID (rivalry)	L 9–16	20,549	
September 18		Augustana (SD)*	Bronco Stadium; Boise, ID	W 42–14	18,057	
September 25		Humboldt State*	Bronco Stadium; Boise, ID	W 33–0	17,837	
October 2		at Montana State	Reno H. Sales Stadium; Bozeman, MT	L 20–24	7,800	
October 9		at Cal Poly*	Mustang Stadium; San Luis Obispo, CA	T 14–14	7,050	
October 16		Montana	Bronco Stadium; Boise, ID	L 14–17	18,472	
October 23		Nevada*	Bronco Stadium; Boise, ID (rivalry)	W 26–8	16,587	
October 30		at No. 10 Northern Arizona	Lumberjack Stadium; Flagstaff, AZ	L 7–42	9,060	
November 6		at UNLV*	Las Vegas Stadium; Whitney, NV	L 26–31	14,066	
November 13		at Idaho State	ASISU Minidome; Pocatello, ID	W 36–0	9,227	
November 20		Weber State	Bronco Stadium; Boise, ID	W 56–31	16,224	
*Non-conference game; Rankings from AP Poll released prior to the game; All times are in Mountain time
