= 1976 Cal State Fullerton Titans football team =

American college football season

1976 Cal State Fullerton Titans football
- Conference: Pacific Coast Athletic Association
- Record: 3–7–1 (1–3 PCAA)
- Head coach: Jim Colletto (2nd season)
- Defensive coordinator: Larry Welsh (1st season)
- Home stadium: Falcon Stadium

1976 Pacific Coast Athletic Association football standings
	Conf.					Overall
Team	W		L		T	W		L		T
San Jose State $	4	–	0	–	0	7	–	4	–	0
Fresno State	3	–	1	–	0	5	–	6	–	0
Long Beach State	2	–	2	–	0	8	–	3	–	0
Cal State Fullerton	1	–	3	–	0	3	–	7	–	1
Pacific (CA)	0	–	4	–	0	2	–	9	–	0
$ – Conference champion

The 1976 Cal State Fullerton Titans football team represented California State University, Fullerton as a member of the Pacific Coast Athletic Association (PCAA) during the 1976 NCAA Division I football season. Led by second-year head coach Jim Colletto, Cal State Fullerton compiled an overall record 3–7–1 with a mark of 1–3 in conference play, placing fourth in the PCAA. The Titans played home games at Falcon Stadium on the campus of Cerritos College in Norwalk, California.

== Schedule ==
Date	Opponent	Site	Result	Attendance	Source
September 11	at Cal Poly Pomona*	Kellogg Field; Pomona, CA	T 10–10	3,494	
September 18	San Jose State	Falcon Stadium; Norwalk, CA	L 0–20	5,644	
October 2	at Fresno State	Ratcliffe Stadium; Fresno, CA	L 12–31	11,500	
October 9	San Francisco State*^{†}	Falcon Stadium; Norwalk, CA	W 31–13	3,161–3,400	
October 16	at Santa Clara*	Buck Shaw Stadium; Santa Clara, CA	W 58–14	5,080	
October 23	at San Diego State*	San Diego Stadium; San Diego, CA	L 14–27	31,225	
October 30	at Hawaii*	Aloha Stadium; Halawa, HI	L 7–27	17,207	
November 6	Pacific (CA)	Falcon Stadium; Norwalk, CA	W 17–7	2,168	
November 13	at Long Beach State	Veterans Stadium; Long Beach, CA	L 8–28	12,500	
November 20	at Cal State Northridge*	Devonshire Downs; Northridge, CA	L 10–16	4,000	
November 27	Northern Arizona*	Falcon Stadium; Norwalk, CA	L 17–20	2,100	
*Non-conference game; ^{†}Homecoming

== Team players in the NFL ==
The following Cal State Fullerton players were selected in the 1977 NFL draft.

Player	Position	Round	Overall	NFL team
Aaron Ball	Linebacker	10	267	Tampa Bay Buccaneers
