= Jeremy Leach =

Profile
- Position: Quarterback

Personal information
- Born: c. 1970
- Listed height: 6 ft 2 in (1.88 m)
- Listed weight: 205 lb (93 kg)

Career information
- College: New Mexico (1988–1991)

Jeremy Leach (born c. 1970) is a former American football quarterback. Leach attended Granada Hills High School in Los Angeles, the same high school as John Elway, and threw 35 touchdown passes as a senior in 1987. He played college football for the New Mexico Lobos from 1988 to 1991. As a sophomore in 1989, he ranked among the leading quarterbacks in major-college football with 511 pass attempts (2nd), 590 total plays (2nd), 20 passing interceptions (2nd), 3,573 passing yards (4th), 22 passing touchdowns (4th), 3,363 total yards (4th), 297.8 yards gained per game played (4th), and 282 pass completions (6th). On November 11, 1989, he broke multiple New Mexico school records, completing 41 of 68 passes for 622 yards – seven yards short of an NCAA record.
