= John Elway Stadium =

Stadium in Granada Hills, California, U.S.

Coordinates: 34.259671°N 118.524526°W

- Interactive map of John Elway Stadium
- Address: 10535 Zelzah Avenue; Granada Hills, California, U.S.
- Seating type: Bleachers
- Surface: Artificial turf

Tenant
- Granada Hills Charter Highlanders (CIF-LA) 1960-Present

John Elway Stadium is a 4,000-seat sports stadium on the campus of Granada Hills Charter High School in Granada Hills, California, a neighborhood of the city of Los Angeles in the San Fernando Valley.

The stadium is named after the legendary Denver Broncos quarterback John Elway, who attended his final two years of high school there.

It is the main stadium for the Granada Hills Charter High School football, athletics (track and field), and soccer teams and the Los Angeles Rampage women's soccer team. It is also the former home ground of the San Fernando Valley Quakes USL Premier Development League soccer team.
