= Cactus Jack =

Cactus Jack may refer to:

== People with the nickname ==
- Mick Foley (born 1965), American actor, writer, professional wrestler, and color commentator
- John Nance Garner (1868–1967), 32nd Vice President of the United States
- Jack Wells (sportscaster) (1911–1999), Canadian broadcaster
- Jack Neumeier (1919–2004), American high school football coach
- Travis Scott (born 1991), American rapper

== Other uses ==
- Cactus Jack (band), a Serbian hard rock band
- Cactus Jack Records, an American record label
- The Villain (1979 film), a 1979 film released as Cactus Jack in the UK and Australia
