= Greg Marderian =

American football player (born 1952)

No. 71
- Position: Defensive tackle

Personal information
- Born: January 15, 1952 (age 74); Burbank, California, U.S.
- Listed height: 6 ft 4 in (1.93 m)
- Listed weight: 250 lb (113 kg)

Career information
- High school: Granada Hills Charter
- College: USC
- NFL draft: 1975: undrafted

Career history
- Southern California Sun (1975); Atlanta Falcons (1976)
- Stats at Pro Football Reference

Gregory John Marderian (born January 15, 1952) is an American former professional football player who was a defensive tackle for the Atlanta Falcons of the National Football League (NFL). He played college football for the USC Trojans.
