= Los Angeles Rampage =

- Full name: Los Angeles Rampage
- Nickname: Rampage
- Founded: 2007
- Ground: John Elway Stadium
- Capacity: 4,000
- Chairman: (United States) Stuart Cohen
- Manager: (Portugal) Emanuel Martins
- League: Women's Premier Soccer League
- 2008: 4th, Pacific South Division
Home colors	Away colors

Los Angeles Rampage is an American women's soccer team, founded in 2007. The team is a member of the Women's Premier Soccer League, the third tier of women's soccer in the United States and Canada. The team plays in the South Division of the Pacific Conference.

The team plays its home games at John Elway Stadium on the campus of Granada Hills Charter High School in the Granada Hills-San Fernando Valley neighborhood of Los Angeles, California. The club's colors are navy blue and white.

== Year-by-year ==
Year	Division	League	Reg. season	Playoffs
2008	3	WPSL	4th, Pacific South	Did not qualify

== Coaches ==
- (Portugal) Emanuel Martins 2008–present
- (United States) Louise Lieberman, Director of Women's Coaching (2005), Director of Coaching (2006–09).

== Stadia ==
- John Elway Stadium; Granada Hills, California 2008–present
- Arroyo Vista Park; Moorpark, California 2008 (1 game)
