= Louise Lieberman =

American soccer coach and former player

Personal information
- Full name: Louise Kristina Lieberman
- Date of birth: May 6, 1977 (age 49)
- Place of birth: Santa Monica, California, U.S.
- Height: 5 ft 2 in (1.57 m)
- Position: Midfielder

Youth career
- 1993–1995: Ajax America Women

College career
Years	Team	Apps	(Gls)
1995–1998	UCLA Bruins		

Senior career*
Years	Team	Apps	(Gls)
2001	Washington Freedom	1	(0)

Managerial career
- 2002: Cal State Pomona (assistant)
- 2009–2016: UCLA Bruins (assistant)
- 2017–2023: San Diego Toreros
- * Club domestic league appearances and goals

Louise Kristina Lieberman (born May 6, 1977) is an American soccer coach and former player. She is the former head coach of the San Diego Toreros women's team. Lieberman played for the Washington Freedom of the Women's United Soccer Association (WUSA) and collegiate soccer for the UCLA Bruins.

== Personal life ==
Lieberman's hometown is Los Angeles, California, and she is one of six children. Her mother Angelita is from Brazil, and her father Anthony, a travel agent, was from Philadelphia, Pennsylvania.

== Playing career ==
Lieberman played soccer at Beverly Hills High School from 1991 to 1995, earning a number of MVP, all-league, and All-CIF honors. She also led her club team, the Fountain Valley Spirit, to a national championship in 1994. She was named one of Soccer America's Elite 11 Recruits as a senior in 1995.

Lieberman played for the UCLA Bruins women's soccer team as a center midfielder, and was a second-team All-Pac-10 selection in 1995. She played in 78 games during her four-year career, with 31 points on seven goals and 17 assists. A two-year winner of the team's Most Inspirational Award, she helped the team win its first two Pac-10 Championships in 1997 and 1998. Lieberman graduated from UCLA in 2000 with a degree in sociology.

She next played one year for the Women's United Soccer Association's Washington Freedom, during the league's inaugural season of 2001. She was able to translate for Lusophone team-mates Roseli de Belo and Pretinha. Lieberman made one 27-minute substitute appearance, in a 1–0 defeat by New York Power on August 11, 2001.

== Coaching career ==
Lieberman was Paul Caligiuri's assistant for the men's and women's soccer teams at California State Polytechnic University, Pomona in 2002. She was hired by the Los Angeles Rampage to be the Director of Women's Coaching in 2005, and became the Director of Coaching the following year and served for three years.

From 2009 to 2016, Lieberman was Assistant Coach of the UCLA Bruins women's soccer team. During that time, the team won the 2013 NCAA National Women's Soccer Championship, the first in team history.

Lieberman was the San Diego Toreros' head coach starting in 2017, when she was hired as the fourth coach in team history. She left the program in November 2023.

Lieberman was an assistant coach for the United States women's national under-23 soccer team from 2017 to 2020. She also worked with the United States women's national under-18 soccer team at their training camps.

== Honors ==
In 2010, she was inducted into the Southern California Jewish Sports Hall of Fame. In 2016 Lieberman was honored with the Cal South Excellence in Coaching Award.
