= Spread offense =

Offensive scheme in American and Canadian football

"Spread offense" may also refer to the four corners offense in basketball.

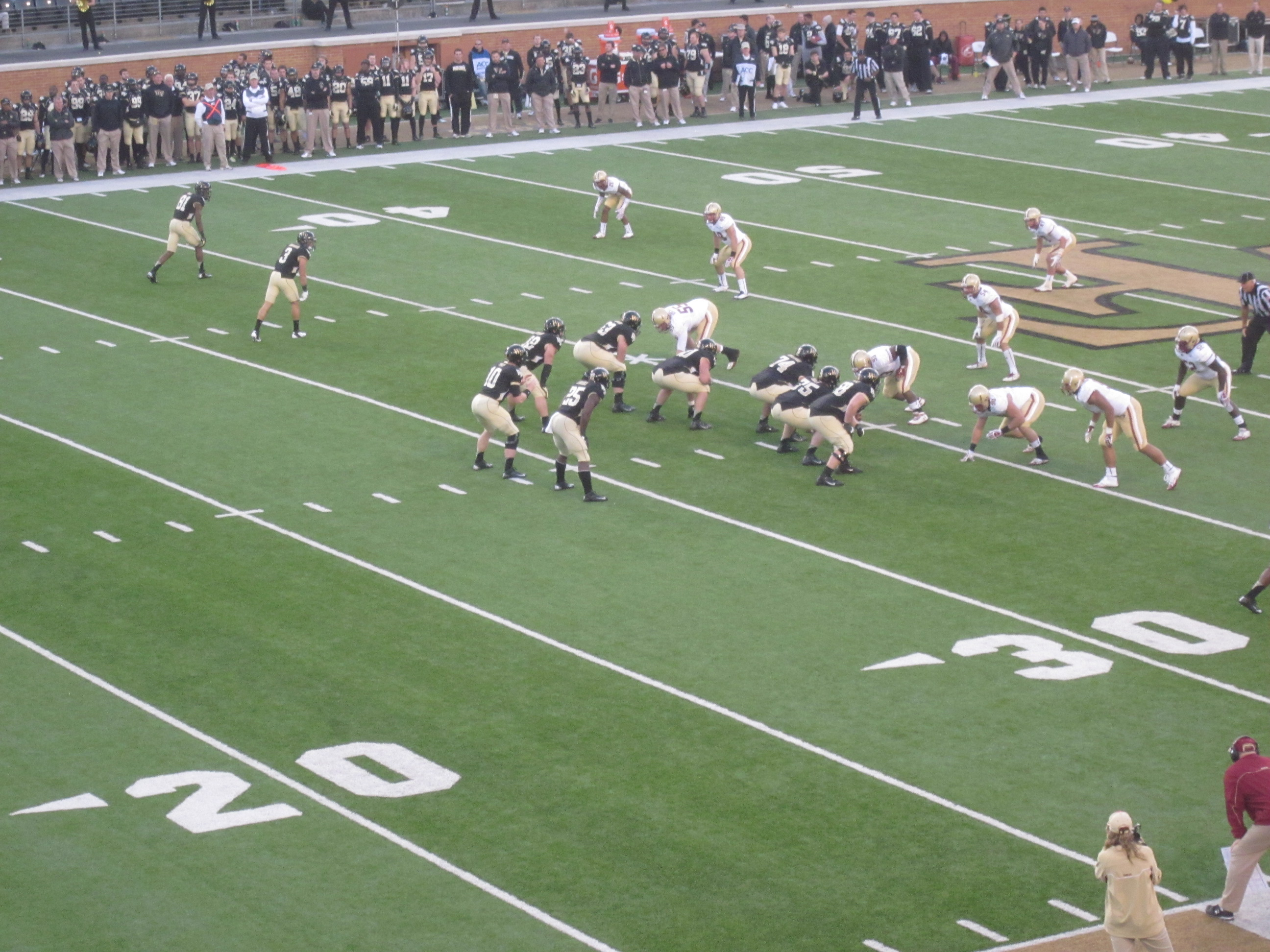
The Wake Forest Demon Deacons are lined up in a three-receiver spread package during a 2012 game against Boston College.

The spread offense is an offensive scheme in gridiron football that typically places the quarterback in the shotgun formation, and "spreads" the offense horizontally using three-, four-, and even five-receiver sets. Used at every level of the game including professional (NFL, CFL), college (NCAA, NAIA, U Sports), and high school programs across the US and Canada, spread offenses often employ a no-huddle approach. Some implementations of the spread also feature wide splits between the offensive linemen.

Spread offenses can emphasize the pass or the run, with the common attribute that they force the defense to cover the entire field from sideline to sideline. Many spread teams use the read option running play to put pressure on both sides of the defense. Similar to the run and shoot offense, passing-oriented spread offenses often leverage vertical (down field) passing routes to spread the defense vertically, which opens up multiple vertical seams for both the running and passing game.

== History ==
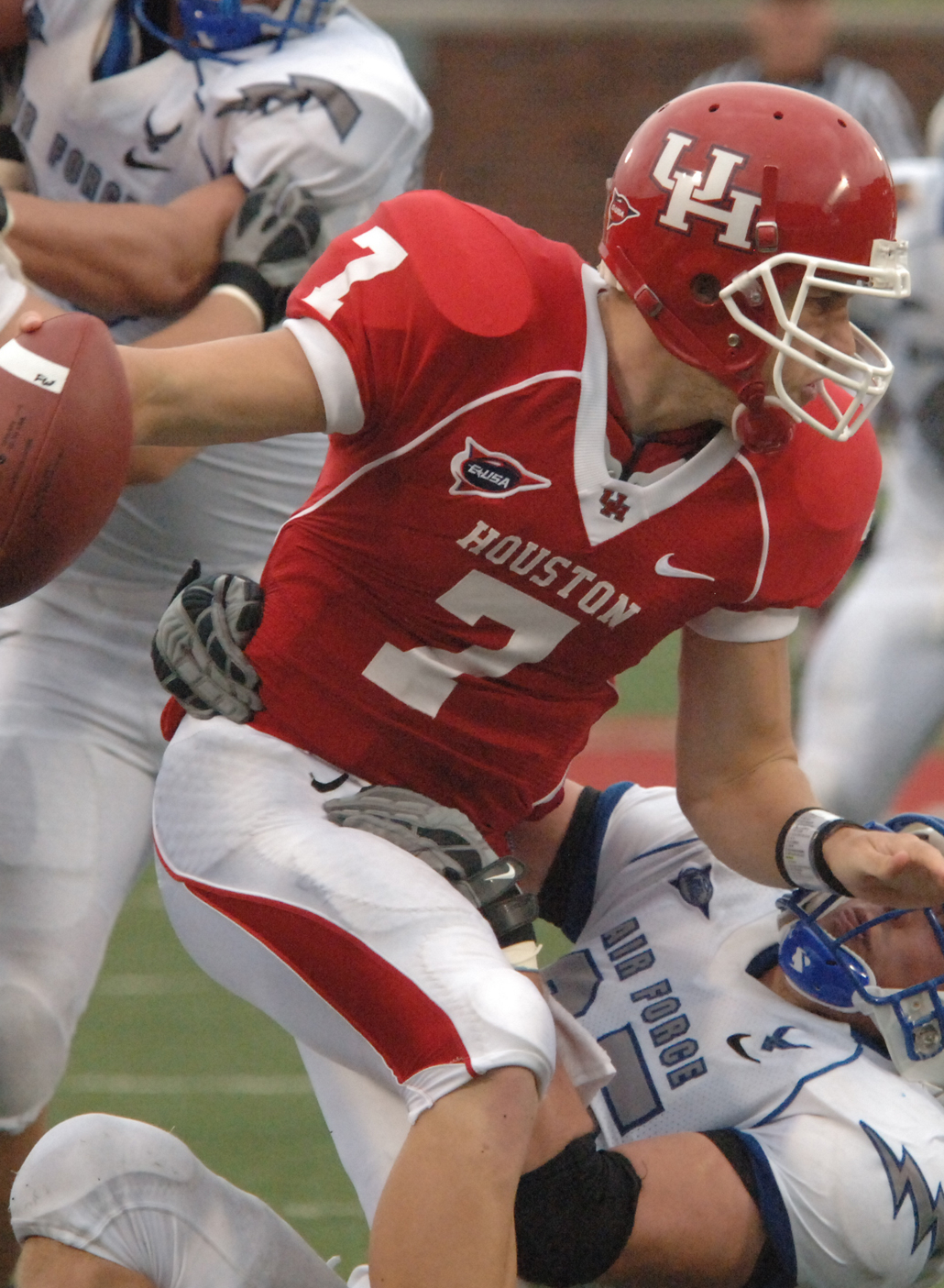
In the Houston Cougars' spread offense, Case Keenum became the NCAA's all-time leading passer.

=== "Dutch" Meyer and early spread formations ===
The grandfather of the spread offense is Rusty Russell, a graduate of Howard Payne University, in Brownwood, Texas, and coach of Fort Worth's Masonic Home and School for orphaned boys. Russell began coaching Masonic Home in 1927, and due to the fact that his teams were often over-matched physically by other schools, they were called the "Mighty Mites". While there, he deployed the earliest form of a spread offense to great success. Russell's team is the subject of a book by author Jim Dent entitled, Twelve Mighty Orphans: The Inspiring True Story of the Mighty Mites Who Ruled Texas Football.

In 1952 Texas Christian University (TCU) coach Leo "Dutch" Meyer wrote a book entitled Spread Formation Football, detailing his ideas about football formations, in which the first sentence was, "Spread formations are not new to football." But Meyer's book introduced the spread to the college game, inspiring Don Coryell among others. In his book, Meyer encapsulated some of the lessons learned during his almost two decades coaching legendary football players like Sammy Baugh and Davey O’Brien at TCU. By lining his receivers and occasionally his backs outside the “box” surrounding the quarterback and the center at the line of scrimmage in a formation that has come to be known as the “Meyer Spread,” also known as the double wing formation, Meyer discovered that it forced defenses to respond by spreading their players. That in turn created natural holes in the line and seams in the defensive secondary. Spreading out the defense reduced the need for power blocking by undersized linemen.

But, as Bart Wright notes in his 2013 book Football Revolution: The Rise of the Spread Offense and How It Transformed College Football, Meyer's spread “slowed the defensive rush to the ball....” While some later football historians and coaches have confused the Meyer Spread, which relied on great quarterbacks like Baugh and O’Brien to pass around 17 times a game on average, with more contemporary spread offenses, Wright concludes that it is “preposterous that Meyer’s offense was any sort of antecedent” to the modern spread offense invented by Jack Neumeier around 1970 (see below).

The spread's first evolution came about in 1956 when former NIU Huskies head coach Howard Fletcher adapted Meyer's spread with the shotgun formation to create what he termed the "Shotgun Spread" a more pass-oriented version. Under Fletcher's newly created offense, quarterback George Bork led the nation in total offense and passing in 1962 and 1963. Bork became the first man in college football history to pass for 3,000 yards in a season in 1963 while guiding the Huskies to a victory in the Mineral Water Bowl and the NCAA College Division National Championship.

However, few coaches around the country followed events in the NCAA College Division and, therefore, few coaches were aware of Fletcher's offense as run-oriented offenses continued to dominate football at every level of play throughout the 1960s. The football played at the dawn of the 1970s generally featured hard running, ball control football, accented occasionally on third and long by a pass out of a stationary pocket. Football coaches have always tended to be a relatively conservative group, and most of them subscribed in 1970 to the aphorism generally attributed to Darrell Royal, then head coach at the University of Texas: “… three things can happen to you whenever you throw the football, and two of ‘em are bad. You can catch the ball, you can throw it incomplete, or have it intercepted.” Consistent with that sentiment, the Green Bay Packers power sweep, the University of Southern California power I formation and Student Body Right, the Texas Wishbone, the Veer triple option and other variations of ball control, option-oriented rushing offenses that pounded the ball down the field dominated coaches’ playbooks at the end of the 1960s.

=== The modern spread: Jack Neumeier and "basketball on grass" ===
A more enduring iteration of the spread offense originated with legendary high school coach Jack Neumeier and his 1970 Granada Hills High School Highlanders Los Angeles City Championship football team. Few examples of coaches with successful, innovative passing offenses existed at any level of competition in late 1969. In his 2010 history, Blood, Sweat and Chalk: The Ultimate Football Playbook: How The Great Coaches Built Today’s Game, documenting the development of the game of football dating back to Pop Warner's invention of the single wing in the early 1900s, Tim Layden of Sports Illustrated credits Neumeier with the invention in 1970 of the modern spread offense, also frequently referred to as the one-back spread or by the phrase "basketball on grass" first utilized by Neumeier in late 1969, which dominates football at every level of play today.

While there is no evidence to suggest Neumeier had heard of Rusty Russell or Howard Fletcher in 1970, Jack Neumeier evidently built his offensive theories upon a foundation established by other coaches, including Glenn “Tiger” Ellison, a high school coach from Ohio and a college teammate and friend of legendary Ohio State coach Woody Hayes. Ellison published a book, Run and Shoot Football: Offense of the Future, in 1965 that found its way into Neumeier's library. In his book, Ellison describes his desperate experiments with the "departure into insanity" Lonesome Polecat sandlot-style formation in a successful attempt to avoid a losing season in 1958.

As described by Tim Layden, "the center lined up alone on the ball and the rest of the offensive line was split out far to his left, two receivers far to his right and the quarterback alone in a shotgun formation. The quarterback was encouraged to scramble and to find open receivers." The initial success of the Lonesome Polecat led Ellison to several years of even more successful tinkering with what came to be known as the "Run and Shoot offense." Ellison's “Run and Shoot” experiment evolved into a double-slot formation with "split ends uniformly 17 yards from the ball, but no closer than six yards from the sideline. Blocking schemes were identical for runs and passes, so as not to tip off the defense, and Ellison’s players made a sincere effort to make ‘every pass look like a run and every run look like a pass,'" according to Layden. The offense used motion and receivers changing pass routes based on the reactions of defenders.

Neumeier then expanded Ellison's ideas to develop a variation of the “Run and Shoot” offense. This system combined pre-snap motion, four-wide-receiver formations, occasional use of the no-huddle offense, and a power running game. Additionally, offensive line coach Jack Mathias introduced blocking innovations specifically designed to accommodate an undersized offensive line. Implemented during the 1970 season and refined in subsequent years, Neumeier's tactical adjustments influenced future football offensive strategies.

Another piece of the puzzle Neumeier assembled preparing for the 1970 season came from Red Hickey during Hickey's stint coaching the San Francisco 49ers. Hickey first utilized the shotgun formation in a 1960 NFL game against the Baltimore Colts. The shotgun, based on an old short punt formation that dated back to the World War I era, which Pop Warner then updated as a double wing formation in the 1930s at Stanford, featured the quarterback setting up for a long snap seven yards behind the center. Hickey thought it might help to slow the Colt pass rush and give the 49ers quarterback another second or two to spot his receivers.

A brief sensation for the 49ers, Hickey's shotgun formation only lasted for the final few games of the 1960 season and a few games into 1961. Opponents soon neutralized the formation when they realized that their defenses could take advantage of the need for the center to focus on the long snap before making his block. Linebackers blitzing up the middle collapsed the pocket protecting 49er quarterbacks. By the end of the 1961 NFL season, football coaches universally agreed that the shotgun formation was dead and buried, until Jack Neumeier resurrected it as part of the new spread passing offense he synthesized.

=== Variations ===
==== Sid Gillman and Don Coryell ====
Sid Gillman, after a long career, coached the San Diego Chargers throughout the 1960s. Before his lengthy stint with the Chargers, he coached the Los Angeles Rams. An innovator with the use of motion and passing in football offenses, Gillman also revolutionized the use of game films to study opposing teams. As a trademark of his offenses, Gillman utilized the forward passing of his talented quarterback John Hadl to Hall of Fame split end Lance Alworth and flanker Gary Garrison to open up defenses for the Chargers’ rushing game and to move the ball down the field.

Gillman continued coaching off and on into the 1980s. During a stint working with the Los Angeles Express of the short-lived United States Football League during the early ‘80s, Gillman became a leading advocate for what some sportswriters referred to as the “ace” formation, a variation of the one-back spread offense that evolved after Jack Neumeier's retirement from coaching.

In an article written by Bob Oates of the Los Angeles Times in 1984, Gillman talked about evolving trends and the future of football. “’The thing that makes the ace formation so effective’ Gillman said, ‘is that it enables you to do so many more things. Its offensive potential – with four guys up there in receiving positions – is mathematically almost limitless. It causes the defense more trouble than any two-back formation.’”

"I think the ace formation will gradually take over as the best way to play football," said Gillman, regarded as one of the game's great offensive strategists of the last 100 years. "Years ago, the coaches spent the 1940s converting to the T-formation – which most of them didn’t like at first. So I won’t be surprised if it takes most of the 1980s to change over to another new formation. The ace is [football’s] most important new strategic scheme since the T came in." Oates gave credit to Gillman protégés Joe Gibbs and Don Coryell with the Washington Redskins and San Diego Chargers, respectively, for developing the offense with only a single back remaining with the quarterback in the backfield. But none of them had developed these ideas when Jack Neumeier began testing his invention in 1970.

Sports historians have called Gillman the “father of the passing game,” and his focus on studying game films certainly influenced most football coaches by the early 1960s, including Jack Neumeier. While Gillman's innovations with the passing game inspired many followers, neither Gillman nor his protégés had utilized the ace formation or developed any other offense resembling the spread as the 1960s came to a close.

The head coach of the San Diego State Aztecs during the mid-‘60s, Don Coryell, found inspiration in Sid Gillman’s passing game. Coryell had developed a national reputation as one of the most prominent innovators of the I formation during the 1950s. Coryell brought the I formation with him when he joined John McKay’s coaching staff at USC for a short stay in 1961, and it became the signature power running formation at what came to be known as Tailback U under McKay and his successor John Robinson.

After his arrival at San Diego State, Coryell would periodically bring his Aztec players to watch Gillman’s Charger practices. They made an impression. Many of Gillman’s innovations with football offenses would appear in Coryell’s game plans, as Coryell gradually shifted from a power running offense to rely increasingly on the forward pass. But Coryell disavowed any direct inspiration from Gillman’s offense. It would take Coryell another decade before the ideas and concepts he tinkered with in the late ‘60s would evolve into what came to be known as Air Coryell. Building on his experiences in San Diego, Coryell took his offense to new heights while coaching the St. Louis Cardinals during the mid-‘70s. He made further strides with his offensive concepts after the Chargers hired him to return to San Diego in 1978. Relying upon quarterback Dan Fouts and a talented array of wide receivers, Coryell’s innovations included sending up to four receivers downfield, with backs in motion and instructions to his quarterbacks to read their receivers in the pattern from deep to short while concentrating on the importance of a quick release.

Football aficionados can trace Coryell’s focus on spacing and downfield movement and separation between receivers back to Dutch Meyer’s 1952 book, "Spread Formation Football." Coryell's emphasis on precisely timed and executed pass routes now seems like the norm at all levels of football. But Don Coryell had just begun experimenting with all of these elements in 1970.

While Tim Layden has referred to Neumeier in Sports Illustrated as “the godfather” of spread formation football, the title of grandfather of the spread offense probably belongs most appropriately to legendary Texas high school coach Rusty Russell. As noted above, Russell utilized a variation of the spread offense as the coach of the Fort Worth Masonic Home and School for orphans beginning during the 1920s. He thought the spread might help his players, who came to be known as the “Mighty Mites” because of their diminutive size, compete against taller, bigger, stronger and faster opponents, much like opposing teams that would dwarf Neumeier's Granada Hills High School team of 1970. Russell's story and the story of his players are encapsulated in the book, "Twelve Mighty Orphans: The Inspiring True Story of the Mighty Mites Who Ruled Texas Football" (2007), by sportswriter and author Jim Dent, so it is clear that variations of a spread offense existed for almost 50 years when Jack Neumeier experienced his epiphany in late 1969. In both cases, it is clear that the coaches came up with similar solutions when confronted with undersized teams that could not compete and win utilizing “conventional” offenses. However, it is unlikely that Jack Neumeier had ever even heard of Rusty Russell or his Mighty Mites as he began designing his new offense in 1969.

==== Other offenses ====
A few years after Jack Neumeier sat pondering enhancements to Tiger Ellison's Run-and-Shoot, Darrel “Mouse” Davis attracted national attention during the early 1970s by incorporating many of Ellison's theories into his game plans at Hillsboro High School in Oregon. They culminated in Hillsboro winning the Oregon state championship in 1973. His success at Hillsboro in turn led Davis to Portland State the following year, initially as offensive coordinator and later as head coach. At Portland State, Davis became the most visible acolyte of Ellison's offensive theories. During his tenure there, Davis coached quarterback legends like June Jones and Neil Lomax. Davis’ success built on Portland State's successful passing attack led during the 1969 and ’70 seasons, coincidentally, by one of Jack Neumeier’s most talented quarterbacks of the mid-‘60s at Granada Hills High School, Tim Von Dulm.

Mouse Davis, who came by his sobriquet as a result of his stature as a 5’5” 135-pound college quarterback, loved to refer to fellow undersized football players as “pissants.” He relished the opportunities the Run-and-Shoot created for pissants matched up against stronger, larger, faster opponents on the playing field. The option reads and pass routes of the Run-and-Shoot allowed the receivers to react to the defense and the quarterback to then read the receivers reacting to the defense. The quarterback would throw the football to a predetermined spot based on those predictably programmed reactions. At the same time, Ellison's offense neutralized the advantages enjoyed by larger, speedier players in favor of the intelligence and physical agility required for success with the Run-and-Shoot. While Ellison's Run-and-Shoot also inspired Jack Neumeier, Neumeier almost certainly had no familiarity with Mouse Davis or Davis’ offensive schemes as Neumeier put his spread offense into action in 1970.

Coach Neumeier's "one-back spread" offense was introduced in 1970 and later implemented in several leagues of American football and became a widespread offensive scheme in the game.

In a 2013 article, sports commentator Matt Offer wrote that Neumeier's “offense could be considered ground zero for all that we have come to think of as modern in the game of Football. Spreading the defense horizontally with formations, and vertically with passing concepts. Isolating defenders in match ups where your guy has the best chance to win. It all seems so simple now, but in 1970 when everyone and their mother was running the Veer it truly was revolutionary.” Nationally respected sportswriter Bart Wright's 2013 book on the history of the modern spread offense, "Football Revolution," gives clear credit to Coach Neumeier and his 1970 Granada Hills Highlanders team for originating what football coaches across the nation have come to know as “basketball on grass.”

In a chapter in Tim Layden's "Blood, Sweat and Chalk" entitled “The One-Back Spread: An L.A. high school coach took a chance and launched an offense – and John Elway and Drew Brees with it,” Layden talks about the “radical change” introduced by Neumeier with his 1970 Highlanders and his “wide-open spread game.” But it took some amazing luck for Coach Neumeier's football ideas to achieve national attention and ultimately dominance.

As they frequently do, following the remarkable success of his 1970 team, other coaches talked about Neumeier's offense and began to incorporate elements of it into their own offensive schemes. Other local high school coaches – mostly competitors – saw it, liked it, copied it and began to utilize it. Today, there are books written about Neumeier's offense. Coaching workshops introduce coaches to the one-back spread and teach them how to implement it. They also teach coaches how to defend against it.

But the story of how the one-back spread offense “went viral,” to use today's internet-driven jargon, isn't quite that simple. In the 1970s, there were no coaching clinics, YouTube videos or internet blogs to make the case for the one-back spread offense to high school coaches, much less college or NFL coaches. Most coaches in 1970 looked at innovative passing offenses with disdain. New football concepts spread slowly through the instinctively conservative ranks of football coaches. Today, it's not even clear who coined the phrase “one-back spread offense.”

For several years after the extraordinary success of his 1970 Granada Hills championship team, Jack Neumeier continued to labor in relative obscurity. While continuing to look for ways to enhance his spread offense, Coach Neumeier never matched the success of his 1970 team. His subsequent teams fairly regularly made it to the Los Angeles City playoffs, but Neumeier's teams would win no more championships. He continued to field teams utilizing the one-back spread offense over the next few years, whether they possessed the unique physical and intellectual skills of his 1970 Granada Hills players or not. Along the way, Neumeier evolved from a “three-yards-and-a-cloud-of-dust guy” in the words of his former assistant coach Darryl Stroh to “a tireless student of the passing game.” Over the next few years, Neumeier's reputation as an innovator began to spread throughout the football coaching community.

Jack Elway, who played quarterback himself during his playing days, arrived in the spring of 1976 as the new head football coach at California State University Northridge after serving as offensive coordinator at his alma mater, Washington State. Before his arrival at CSUN, literally down the street from Granada Hills High School, Coach Elway went looking for a coach and a high school football program that would nurture the budding talents of his son John, who had played 9th grade football in Washington. Jack Elway heard about Neumeier through the coaching grapevine and the two immediately hit it off. With John entering the 10th grade and Granada Hills High School – still a three-year high school – located literally a few blocks down the street from the Cal State Northridge campus, the Elways moved into the neighborhood.

Neumeier ran precisely the type of offense Jack Elway imagined for his son John, a tremendous all-around athlete. But John Elway envisioned himself as a running back on the football field as he entered high school. Fortunately, Jack Elway had already begun to work on persuading his son to rethink his options. When John Elway met Jack Neumeier during the summer of 1976, it took almost no time at all for the seasoned Scot coach to persuade John to give up his dreams of following in the footsteps of his idol, running back Calvin Hill. Instead, Neumeier helped John to imagine himself as a quarterback and the focal point of the Granada Hills spread offense, originally designed for the incredibly accurate passing skills of Neumeier's 1970 Granada Hills High School quarterback Dana Potter. Potter would help coach the newly arrived 10th grader in the nuances of the spread.

Little did Jack Neumeier realize at that moment that, with Elway's arrival at Granada, he would evolve his offense to highlight the rifle arm of a future NFL Hall of Famer. In fact, Elway would rapidly grow and mature into a 6’3 185-pounder by the start of his 11th grade season, ironically taller and heavier than four out of five of the offensive linemen on Neumeier's 1970 championship team. Years later, in an interview with a reporter for the Denver Post, John Elway stated that Jack Neumeier “was the guy who made me fall in love with football at the quarterback position.” Part of that love affair centered around Elway's experiences playing quarterback in the one-back spread offense that Neumeier created in collaboration with his assistant coaches and their 1970 City championship Granada Hills team.

When Jack Elway watched his own son running Neumeier's offense and saw the potential in it, he began to rethink his own offensive schemes, which focused at the time like many of his contemporaries around the triple-option Veer. In 1977, Mike Price, a friend and former colleague of Jack Elway who still coached at Washington State, called the Cal State Northridge head coach to talk shop. According to Tim Layden, the senior Elway told Price that the really interesting action was taking place on the field at the nearby high school where his son John was playing quarterback under Jack Neumeier. “’Never mind what I’m doing,’ Elway said. ‘You should see the stuff my son is running. They’re killing people, just killing ‘em. I’m putting this stuff [into my own offense] next year.’”

Jack Elway began to utilize the one-back spread in his offense at Northridge during the 1978 season. He took it with him when he became head coach at San Jose State a year later. During his tenure at San Jose State and later at Stanford, Jack Elway became an even more successful proselytizer for the one-back spread offense. Elway worked with Jack Neumeier to teach the offense to a number of prominent members of the coaching profession, most significantly Dennis Erickson. Erickson served as Jack Elway’s offensive coordinator at San Jose State.

Dennis Erickson initially heard about the spread offense while serving as the offensive coordinator at Fresno State in the late 1970s. Moving on to San Jose State in 1979, he combined his ideas about the offense with Jack Elway’s. As a result of the Elway connection, Erickson spent time that year learning about the offense with Jack Neumeier. In fact, in Matt Opper’s 2013 article, by the late-1970s, Granada Hills had become “a must stop destination for college coaches across the nation.”

Over the next few years, Erickson tinkered with the Neumeier offense and then took it with him to subsequent head coaching positions. Erickson coached during the ‘80s at Idaho, Wyoming and Washington State, before arriving as head coach at the University of Miami in 1989. At Miami that year, Erickson won the first of two NCAA national championships with Neumeier’s offense, winning again in 1991 and losing the national title game in 1992, with Gino Torretta winning the 1992 Heisman Trophy quarterbacking out of the one-back spread. Erickson’s success at Miami brought even more coaches from all over the country to learn the intricacies of Jack Neumeier’s offense. Erickson later moved on to head coaching positions in the NFL with the Seattle Seahawks and the San Francisco 49ers and in the college ranks at Oregon State and Arizona State, continuing to spread the word about Neumeier’s offense wherever he went. Later, as the running backs coach at the University of Utah, Erickson continued to serve as a leading advocate for the one-back spread.

Mike Price, a high school teammate of Dennis Erickson, once described Neumeier’s offense to a reporter for the New York Daily News as “basketball on grass” – Jack Neumeier's own description of the one-back spread offense. Price installed the Neumeier one-back spread at Weber State when he became the head coach there in the late 1970s and then inherited Erickson's offense when Price took over as head coach at Washington State following Erickson's departure. Price utilized the offense during his time as head coach at Washington State, taking his team to the 1997 Rose Bowl, which attracted additional attention to Neumeier's offense. Similarly, when Joe Tiller succeeded Dennis Erickson as head coach at Wyoming, Tiller simply left in place the one-back spread offense that Erickson installed during his tenure there. Tiller says that, “People have asked me for years how I learned this offense. I tell them, ‘Dennis left his playbook at Wyoming.’ And that's absolutely the truth.’” But the other element of the story is that Tiller, who coached with his buddy Jack Elway at Washington State during the mid-1970s, had begun hearing about the Neumeier one-back spread from Elway in 1979.

Tiller went on to become an outstanding college head coach at Purdue. At Purdue, Tiller utilized the one-back spread offense again with tremendous success. His quarterbacks at Purdue playing out of the one-back spread included Kyle Orton and Drew Brees, among others. In 2000, Brees led the Boilermakers to the Rose Bowl with Neumeier’s offense. Tiller’s teams forced the Big Ten to adapt to the challenges posed by the wide-open one-back spread.

In a chapter from his 2012 book "The Essential Smart Football" entitled “The Evolution of Urban Meyer and His Spread Option Offense,” Chris Brown identifies Dennis Erickson as one of the “spiritual fathers” of Meyer's spread/single wing hybrid offense. Meyer refined his offense at Bowling Green, Utah and Florida, where he won national championships in 2006 and 2008 and coached the 2007 Heisman Trophy winner, Tim Tebow. Most recently, Meyer's offense has enjoyed remarkable success at Ohio State since he took over as head coach for the 2012 season, winning the 2014 national championship. Meyer, according to Tim Layden, learned his passing attack “from Louisville and offensive coordinator Scott Linehan (who played at Idaho for Dennis Erickson and would later become offensive coordinator for a number of NFL teams and head coach of the St. Louis Rams).” Linehan credits Dennis Erickson for his own approach to football offenses.

Brown confirms this lineage for Urban Meyer's offensive theories and success, also connecting the Ohio State coach to Joe Tiller and Rich Rodriguez, among other coaches who have built successful careers coaching variations on the one-back spread offense. So at least some of Urban Meyer's theories about football offenses, leading to Ohio State's most recent national championship, trace directly back to Jack Neumeier.

==== Neumeier's influence ====
Today, virtually every NFL, college, high school and youth league football offense shows clear signs of Coach Neumeier's influence. Fans can watch elements of Neumeier's offense at every level of play, from peewee league scrimmages to NFL Super Bowls. In the 2016 College Football Playoff National Championship bowl game and the 2016 Super Bowl, all of the offenses were direct descendants of the turbocharged “basketball on grass” offense that Jack Neumeier created out of desperation for his undersized 1970 Granada Hills High School football team. His offense continues to live on and thrive years after Jack Neumeier's death in 2004.

Reflecting on the enduring impact of Neumeier's spread offense, sportswriter Mary Crouse wrote that “It amuses Neumeier's first guinea pig, [Dana] Potter, to see a college or pro team throw the ball out of the shotgun on first down or attempt 40 passes a game. The same things stirred critics when Neumeier introduced them to the [Los Angeles] City football scene. ‘I had a lot of coaches tell me Coach Neumeier's offense would never work in college or the pros,' Potter said. `So it's hilarious for me to see how many teams are using it now. It's neat to see how his offense has evolved.’

The "Aerial attack" - a one-back spread offense - spread through football over several decades. Neumeier's theories and the performance of the 1970 team influenced the sport.

The "Spread Offense" was popularized in the US in the mid to late 80s with coaches trying to spread out defenses and dictate defensive personnel with a 4 receiver set without having to rely as much on QBs, receivers, and running backs making the correct reads on every play. While early versions of the spread were sometimes quite limited, modern coaches like Joe Tiller (Purdue), Jerry Moore (Appalachian State), Mike Leach (Washington State), and Mark Helfrich (Oregon) and most recently Urban Meyer (Ohio State) have taken the spread offense to a new level. High school coaches across the nation have adapted some version of this scheme with great success, notably Todd Dodge at Southlake Carroll High School in the Dallas–Fort Worth area (now at Austin Westlake High School in Austin, TX), Art Briles at Stephenville High School in Central Texas and the Houston Cougars (then at Baylor), Gus Malzahn at Springdale High School in Arkansas (later the offensive coordinator for the Tulsa Golden Hurricane, head coach for the Arkansas Razorbacks, Auburn Tigers, and UCF Knights, and current offensive coordinator for the Florida State Seminoles). Legendary coach Dale Mueller at Highlands High School in Fort Thomas, Kentucky has pioneered new aspects of the spread offense since 1995. In his 16 seasons as head coach, he has led Highlands to a record of 214 wins and 30 losses, and won 10 of their record 21 state championships.

== Overview ==
The spread offense is specifically designed to open up seams and holes for the offense, and does not specifically focus on the passing or running game, however, like all types of offenses, there can be subtypes which can specifically focus on the passing or running game, or even option, fakes or trick plays.

=== Philosophical differences ===
The basic pre-snap appearance of the spread offense is constant—multiple receivers on the field. Most contemporary versions of the spread utilize a shotgun snap, although many teams also run the spread with the quarterback under center. Jack Neumeier's 1970 iteration of the spread offense utilized both formations. In addition, the actual execution from those formations varies, depending on the preferences of the coaching staff. While most of these are balanced offenses, such as the one utilized by Larry Fedora's North Carolina Tar Heels, several sub-forms also exist.

==== Air Raid ====
One of the extreme versions is the pass-oriented Air Raid typified by Hal Mumme in the late 1990s at the University of Kentucky. Coaches that employ this version of the spread are Mike Gundy's Oklahoma State Cowboys, Sonny Dykes's TCU Horned Frogs, Mario Cristobal's Miami Hurricanes, Lincoln Riley's USC Trojans, Matt Rhule's Nebraska Cornhuskers, and Ryan Day's Ohio State Buckeyes. This version employs multiple spread sets and is heavily reliant on the quarterback and coaches being able to call the appropriate play at the line of scrimmage based on how the defense sets up. Current TCU Horned Frogs head coach Sonny Dykes, who coached under Mike Leach at Texas Tech, uses a variant of the Air Raid that makes more use of the running game and tight ends and running backs in the passing game.

==== Spread option ====
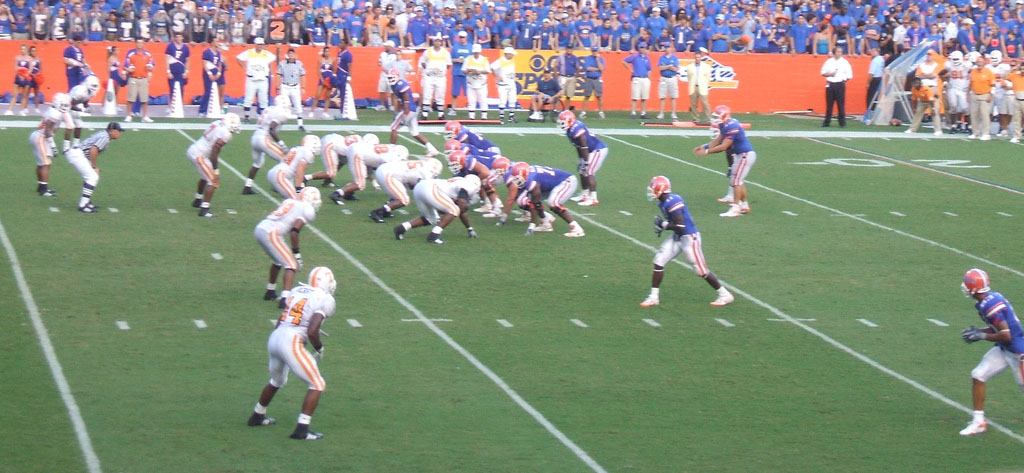
The 2007 Florida Gators running Urban Meyer's spread option.

The spread option is a shotgun-based variant of the classic option attack that was prevalent in football well into the 1990s, and often includes option plays adapted from the veer offense and triple option. Notable users of this offense include Brent Venables' Oklahoma Sooners, Mike Norvell’s Florida State Seminoles, Rich Rodriguez’s West Virginia Mountaineers, Scott Frost’s UCF Knights, Kyle Whittingham’’s Michigan Wolverines and Scott Satterfield's Cincinnati Bearcats. The spread option is a run-first scheme that requires a quarterback that is comfortable carrying the ball, a mobile offensive line that can effectively pull and trap, and receivers that can hold their blocks. Its essence is misdirection. Because it operates from the shotgun, its triple option usually consists of a slot receiver, a tailback, and a dual-threat quarterback. One of the primary plays in the spread option is the zone read, invented and made popular by Rich Rodriguez. The quarterback must be able to read the defensive end and determine whether he is collapsing down the line or playing up-field containment in order to determine the proper play to make with the ball. A key component of the spread option is that the running threat posed by the quarterback forces a defensive lineman or linebacker to "freeze" in order to plug the running lane; this has the effect of blocking the target player without needing to put a body on him.

==== Pistol ====
A third version of the spread offense is the Pistol offense used by Brian Polian's Nevada Wolf Pack, Dabo Swinney's Clemson Tigers and some US high schools. Developed by Chris Ault, the Pistol focuses on using the run with many offensive players, and it calls for the quarterback to line up about three yards behind the center and take a short shotgun snap at the start of each play. Instead of lining up next to the quarterback like in the normal shotgun, the tailback lines up behind the quarterback at normal depth. This enables him to take a handoff while running toward the line of scrimmage, rather than parallel to it as is the case from the standard shotgun. Since Ault installed the Pistol in 2004, his Wolf Pack has been among the NCAA's most productive offenses. In 2009, they led the country in rushing and total offense, and were also the first team in college football history to have three players rush for 1,000 yards in the same season.

=== Defensive reaction ===
Recently, use of the spread has led to new defenses, most noticeably the 3-3-5. Traditional defenses use 4 or 5 down linemen sets to stop an offense, but with the growing number of spread offenses, teams are looking to smaller, faster defensive players to cover more of the field. The strategy and philosophy behind this thinking has been widely debated and many coaches have found success using a 30 front, or using a 40 front against the spread.

== Levels ==
=== NFL ===
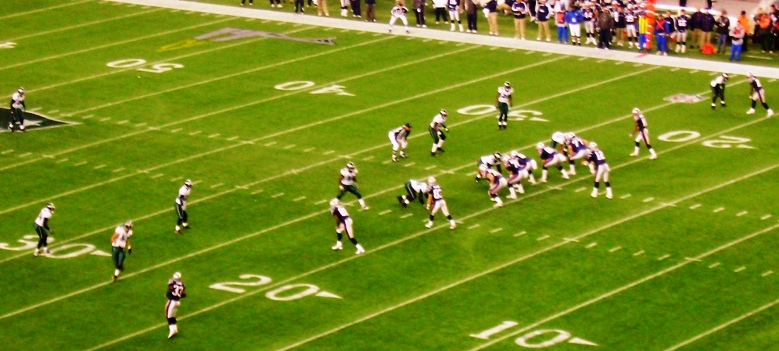
The New England Patriots lined up in a spread formation against the Philadelphia Eagles in 2007

Versions of this scheme have also been used by professional teams, beginning with the Seattle Seahawks under Dennis Erickson in 1995. Erickson has repeatedly credited Jack Neumeier with teaching Erickson the spread initially while Erickson was the offensive coordinator for San Jose State during the late 1970s. Although the Seattle Seahawks, Washington Redskins, and San Francisco 49ers had implemented the spread between 1995 and 2004, the scheme didn't begin having prominent success in the NFL until the 2007 New England Patriots utilized the spread with quarterback Tom Brady and wide receivers Randy Moss, Wes Welker, Donté Stallworth, and Jabar Gaffney. In addition, the San Diego Chargers (1980s) and the various West Coast schemes developed by Bill Walsh and the San Francisco 49ers (1980s) built their offenses, in many ways, on Ellison's and Davis' designs.

The 2008 Miami Dolphins also implemented some form of the spread offense in their offensive schemes. Lining up in the "wildcat" formation, the Miami Dolphins, borrowing from Gus Malzahn's college spread offense, “direct snap” the ball to their running back, Ronnie Brown, who was then able to read the defense, and either pass or keep the ball himself.

The spread offense is generally not used as a team's primary offense in the NFL. NFL defenses are usually faster than college defenses, which allows the vertical seams created by the formation to close up more quickly. In addition, the quarterback is more vulnerable to injury since he is the ball carrier more often than in a typical pro-style offense (thus, getting tackled more) and the amount of protection is decreased with the backs and receivers being used to spread the defense instead of providing pass protection. Since the level of talent between the starting quarterback and the backup is generally much greater than with a typical college team, NFL teams are more protective of their quarterback. With that said, this has been changing in recent years with Chan Gailey in 2008 with the Kansas City Chiefs utilizing Tyler Thigpen at quarterback and now to the Buffalo Bills. The Green Bay Packers have also been running a lot of plays from spread formations with quarterback Aaron Rodgers.

NFL teams that used the spread offense
Start	End	Team	Head coach	Offensive coordinator
1995	1998	Seattle Seahawks	Dennis Erickson	Bob Bratkowski
2002	2003	Washington Redskins	Steve Spurrier	Hue Jackson
2003	2004	San Francisco 49ers	Dennis Erickson	Greg Knapp and Ted Tollner
2010	2012	Buffalo Bills	Chan Gailey	Curtis Modkins
2011	2022	New England Patriots	Bill Belichick	Bill O'Brien / Josh McDaniels
2013	2015	Philadelphia Eagles	Chip Kelly	Pat Shurmur
2014	2020	Houston Texans	Bill O'Brien	Tim Kelly
2014	2015	Miami Dolphins	Joe Philbin	Bill Lazor
2014	2015	Tampa Bay Buccaneers	Lovie Smith	Jeff Tedford
2015	2017	New York Jets	Todd Bowles	Chan Gailey / John Morton
2016	2016	San Francisco 49ers	Chip Kelly	Curtis Modkins
2021	2021	Jacksonville Jaguars	Urban Meyer	Darrell Bevell

=== High school ===
In recent years, the spread offense has become a very popular term used in context of the high school game with the offense's innovative ways to make the game faster and higher scoring. While it has changed the game, and teams that successfully run it are scoring more points, there is debate whether the offensive system is as effective as it seems.

Some coaches have taken to packaging their offensive system and marketing them to programs around the country, such as Tony Franklin, who served as an assistant coach at the University of Kentucky under Hal Mumme where he developed his offense based on Mumme's "Air Raid" system. Manny Matsakis being another example as he is the inventor of the Triple Shoot Offense, which is a spread set with forms in the Shotgun, Pistol and under center. Matsakis was an assistant coach under both Mike Leach at Texas Tech and Bill Snyder at Kansas State. He is currently the head coach of Enka High School in Asheville, North Carolina.

As a reaction to the success of the spread offense in high-profile colleges, such as The University of Florida, innovative high school coaches began retooling the system to work on high school teams. Now the system has been widely adopted, with numerous schools achieving success. Defenses are left with the challenge of defending more of the field than ever before, and the offense was given the advantage of having numerous running and passing lanes created by the defense being so spread out.
