= Jack Neumeier =

American football coach (1919–2004)

Jack "Cactus Jack" Neumeier (1919 – 2004) was an American high school football coach from 1946 to 1978. He invented American football's modern spread offense, also known as the one-back spread offense, and originated the phrase "basketball on grass" to describe this offense.

== Career ==
Neumeier was inventor of American football's spread offense (1969-70) as the head coach at Granada Hills High School from 1960 to 1978 and won the Los Angeles City championship in 1970. He was California football Coach of the Year in 1970. His most famous player was John Elway, who played for Neumeier from 1976 to 1978. Dennis Erickson, who first met Neumeier through Jack Elway, while serving as Jack Elway's offensive coordinator at San Jose State, learned about the spread offense directly from Neumeier. Erickson, Joe Tiller and other coaches subsequently coached national championship teams and Heisman Trophy winners using Neumeier's offense, which is now utilized in some form by almost every football team at every level of play, NFL, college, high school and youth football. He continued to mentor other coaches utilizing variations of his spread offense until Neumeier's death in 2004.
