= Granada Hills Charter High School =

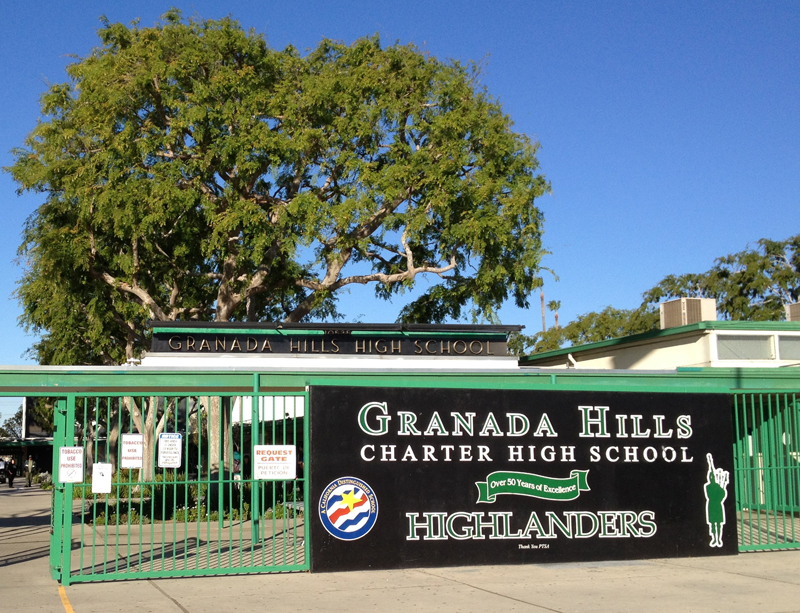

Location
- 10535 Zelzah Avenue; Los Angeles, California 91344; United States; 34°15′40″N 118°31′31″W

Information
- Type: Charter school
- Motto: Home of the Highlanders
- Established: 1960; 66 years ago
- School district: Los Angeles Unified School District
- NCES School ID: 060220603050
- CEO/Superintendent: Brian Bauer
- Teaching staff: 237.91 (FTE) (2023–24)
- Grades: 9-12 (Main campus); K-8 (Devonshire campus)
- Student to teacher ratio: 25.28 (2023–24)
- Colors: Green; Black; White
- Athletics conference: CIF Los Angeles City Section
- Nickname: Highlanders
- Accreditation: WASC
- Newspaper: The Plaid Press
- Yearbook: Tartan
- Website: ghctk12.com

Granada Hills Charter High School (abbreviated as Granada Hills Charter or GHCHS) is a public charter school in the Granada Hills neighborhood of Los Angeles, California, United States. It is affiliated with the Los Angeles Unified School District (LAUSD).

Granada also, as of 2011, has a high Academic Performance Index (API) score of 878, greatly exceeding the target API score of 800 for all schools in California. On April 12, 2011, Granada was named a 2011 California Distinguished School. On December 22, 2011, Granada became an International Baccalaureate World School. Since 2011, the school has won ten National Academic Decathlon Championships.

== History ==
Granada Hills High School is a comprehensive public high school, founded in 1960. Bryce Schurr was the first acting principal of the school. It was in the Los Angeles City High School District until 1961, when it merged into LAUSD.

In the 1970–71 and 1971–72 school years, Granada Hills High had one of the largest student bodies of any high school in the United States. Overcrowding at the school was relieved with the 1971 opening of John F. Kennedy High School.

In 1994, the school opened a LAUSD magnet school with emphasis on math, science, and technology in conjunction with the California State University, Northridge. In 2003, the Los Angeles Board of Education voted to allow the school to become a charter, making it the largest school in the United States to convert to a charter school. The school administration asked for charter status since being directly operated by the district limited its fundraising opportunities, and it was also against LAUSD funding cuts. Charter status also brought instructional autonomy.

In mid-2013, Granada Hills Charter High School purchased the nearby Pinecrest Northridge Elementary School campus for $5.6M, using funds obtained from the American Recovery and Reinvestment Act of 2009. Granada Hills Charter High School used this new land to create iGranada, a campus specializing in digital arts and sciences. This campus opened for the first time for the Fall 2015 school year.

As part of their Charter Renewal Petition, GHCHS has applied to increase its enrollment from 4,300 students to 5,500 students. This includes adding approximately 200 additional grades 9–12 seats to the existing GHCHS campus, through a Charter Augmentation Grant, and adding up to 1,000 additional seats at the Pinecrest site (or at another possible property acquisition).

In 2020, the grade span changed to K–12.

== Demographics ==
White	Hispanic/Latino	Asian	Black	Pacific Islander	Native American	Two or More Races
23%	42%	26%	4%	0.4%	0.3%	3%

According to U.S. News & World Report, as of 2019, 75% of Granada's student body is "minority," with 47% of the student body coming from an economically disadvantaged household, determined by student eligibility for California's Reduced-price meal program.

The school is accredited by the Western Association of Schools and Colleges.

== Facilities ==
The school's sports stadium, John Elway Stadium, is used by the Los Angeles Rampage women's soccer team and is the former home ground of the San Fernando Valley Quakes United Soccer League Premier Development League soccer team.

== Academics ==
Granada offers 29 Advanced Placement courses and 38 IB courses.

=== Academic Decathlon ===
The Academic Decathlon team won back-to-back-to-back national championships in 2011, 2012 and 2013. The 2015 team began another championship streak as Granada Hills went on to win again in 2016, 2017, 2019, 2021, 2022, and 2026.

=== Speech & Debate ===
Granada Hills Charter has a nationally ranked Speech and Debate team, and consistently sends students to both the California High School Speech Association State Championships and National Speech and Debate Association Championship. Granada Hills was the 2008 CHSSA State Champion in Thematic interpretation. In 2011 the school took 13th at the CHSSA State tournament in Original Prose and Poetry. Also in 2011, Granada Hills Charter won the Stanford Junior Varsity LD tournament (Yellow River). In 2017, Granada Hills Charter won 1st place in Original Advocacy at the CHSSA State Tournament, taking 14th overall. In 2024, Granada Hills won 1st place in Presiding Officer, 8th place in Humorous Interpretation, 9th & 11th Place in Congressional Debate, 13th in National Extemporaneous Speaking, and 14th place in Original Prose and Poetry at the CHSSA State tournament. GHC placed 13th in the Overall Sweepstakes. At the 2024 NSDA National Tournament, the school had semifinalists in Congressional Debate in the House & Senate, and a double octafinalist in World Schools Debate. A student also won 12th speaker in World Schools Debate.

=== Model United Nations ===
The nationally ranked Model United Nations team at Granada Hills Charter has been recognized at various conferences across North America. During the 2017–2018 season, they won Best Small Delegation at Harvard Model UN (HMUN). In 2019, GHC Model UN won the Award of Distinction at the National High School Model United Nations (NHSMUN). GHCMUN notably hosts the Valley Regional Model United Nations (VRMUN), the first high-school Model UN conference in the San Fernando Valley.

=== Robotics ===
The school's robotics team, The Robodox, participates in both the FIRST Robotics Competition (FRC) and in the VEX Robotics Competition (VRC). The team builds robots that compete in these competitions. Students are responsible for every step of construction, from designing and manufacturing to coding and CADing. The Robotics team also helps out the local community with its outreach programs, spreading the importance of STEM Education. In 2018, the Robodox won the VRC California State competition. In 2021 the FIRST robotics portion of the team competed in Tidal Tumble winning the competition with its two alliance members 4414 and 973 In addition, the team mastered the use of machines using them to create tons of parts this season leading to the team going undefeated for over 3 matches this season due to the revolutionary design choices.

=== Marching Band & Color Guard ===
In 2012, the Granada Hills Charter High School Marching Band was awarded a bronze medal at the 2012 SCSBOA Division 5A Field Show Championships. In 2016, the Highlander Band participated in the 2016 Bands of America St. George Regional Championships in St. George, Utah and was awarded and recognized as a SCSBOA 4A Finalist that year.

== Athletics ==
=== Baseball ===
Ryan Braun was a four-year letterman on the Granada Hills High School baseball team, and a three-year team captain and Most Valuable Player (MVP). In 2002, he batted .451 as a senior, with an OBP of .675, and broke the school record for career home runs with 25.

=== Football ===
In 1970, Granada Hills High School won the L.A. City Football Championship with the five-receiver passing attack developed by Coach Jack Neumeier later known as the spread offense. A few years later, this innovation attracted the attention of John Elway's father, Jack Elway, after Jack Elway assumed the head football coaching position at California State University, Northridge, and the Elway family moved to Los Angeles.

== Notable alumni ==
- Ariane Andrew, professional wrestler
- Doug Baker, former baseball player, Detroit Tigers and Minnesota Twins
- Dave Baldwin, college football coach
- Valerie Bertinelli, actress
- Ryan Braun, former baseball player, Milwaukee Brewers, and 2011 Major League Baseball MVP
- Jamal Brooks, former football player, Dallas Cowboys and St. Louis Rams
- Bill Buford, author, writer for The New Yorker
- Dennis Delaney, writer, actor, founding member of Greenpeace USA
- John Elway, former football player, Denver Broncos and member of Pro Football Hall of Fame
- Robert Englund, actor
- Jo Freeman, feminist writer and political scientist
- Raja Gosnell, film director and editor
- Travis Kalanick, co-founder of Uber
- Barry Kerzin, professor of medicine and Buddhist monk
- Hana Mae Lee, comedian and actress
- John S. Lee, current Los Angeles City Councilmember, 12th District
- Kameron Loe, former professional baseball player
- Greg Marderian, former football player, Atlanta Falcons
- Gary Matthews Jr., former professional baseball player
- Blanchard Montgomery, former football player, San Francisco 49ers
- Michael Morhaime, videogame producer and cofounder of Blizzard Entertainment
- Neal Morse, singer-songwriter, multi-instrumentalist, bandleader and progressive rock composer
- Jeffrey Lee Pierce, musician and author
- Abhimanyu Rajp, professional cricketer
- Lisa Nehus Saxon, sports writer
- Dave Schmidt, former professional baseball player
- Bruce Timm, artist, director, producer
- Tamlyn Tomita, actress
- Avantika Vandanapu, actor
