= 1976 Little All-America college football team =

American college football all-star team

The 1976 Little All-America college football team, also known as the College Division All-America football team, is composed of college football players from small colleges and universities who were selected by the Associated Press (AP) as the best players at each position.

== First team ==
Position	Player	Team
Offense
Quarterback	Richard Ritchie	Texas A&I
Running back	Augusta Lee	Alcorn State
Running back	Ted McKnight	Minnesota–Duluth
Running back	Jim Van Wagner	Michigan Tech
Wide receiver	Danny Fulton	Nebraska–Omaha
Tight end	Scott Levenhagen	Western Illinois
Tackle	Ed Burns	Tennessee Tech
Tackle	Paul Wagner	Coe
Guard	Rocky Gullickson	Moorhead State (MN)
Guard	Mark Van Horn	Akron
Center	Ted Petersen	Eastern Illinois
Defense
Defensive end	Jim Haslett	IUP
Defensive end	Dave Marreel	Midland Lutheran
Defensive tackle	Ricky Locklear	Elon
Defensive tackle	Larry Warren	Alcorn State
Middle guard	Roy Samuelsen	Springfield (MA)
Linebacker	Rick Budde	North Dakota State
Linebacker	Tim Collins	Chattanooga
Linebacker	Larry Grunewald	Texas A&I
Defensive back	Greg Anderson	Montana
Defensive back	Greg Lee	Western Illinois
Defensive back	Jimmy Parker	Wabash

== See also ==
- 1976 College Football All-America Team
