= 1976 East Tennessee State Buccaneers football team =

American college football season

1976 East Tennessee State Buccaneers football
- Conference: Ohio Valley Conference
- Record: 3–7 (3–4 OVC)
- Head coach: Roy Frazier (4th season)
- Home stadium: Memorial Stadium

1976 Ohio Valley Conference football standings
	Conf.					Overall
Team	W		L		T	W		L		T
No. 5 Eastern Kentucky $^	6	–	1	–	0	8	–	3	–	0
Tennessee Tech	5	–	2	–	0	8	–	3	–	0
Murray State	4	–	3	–	0	5	–	6	–	0
Austin Peay	3	–	4	–	0	5	–	6	–	0
Western Kentucky	3	–	4	–	0	4	–	5	–	1
East Tennessee State	3	–	4	–	0	3	–	7	–	0
Middle Tennessee	2	–	5	–	0	4	–	7	–	0
Morehead State	2	–	5	–	0	2	–	9	–	0
$ – Conference champion; ^ – NCAA Division II playoff participant; Morehead State record adjusted for forfeit to Marshall; Rankings from Associated Press poll

The 1976 East Tennessee State Buccaneers football team represented East Tennessee State University as a member of the Ohio Valley Conference (OVC) during the 1976 NCAA Division II football season. Led by fourth-year head coach Roy Frazier, the Buccaneers compiled an overall record of 3–7, with a mark of 3–4 in conference play, and finished tied for fourth in the OVC.

== Schedule ==
Date	Opponent	Site	Result	Attendance	Source
September 11	at Appalachian State*	Conrad Stadium; Boone, NC	L 3–44	12,330	
September 25	at Eastern Kentucky	Hanger Field; Richmond, KY	L 10–21	12,800	
October 2	No. 8 Western Kentucky	Memorial Stadium; Johnson City, TN	W 28–16	5,800	
October 16	Western Carolina*^{†}	Memorial Stadium; Johnson City, TN	L 0–14	8,500	
October 23	at Murray State	Roy Stewart Stadium; Murray, KY	W 13–11	2,000	
October 30	Tennessee Tech	Memorial Stadium; Johnson City, TN	W 18–7	2,000	
November 6	Morehead State	Memorial Stadium; Johnson City, TN	L 7–17	2,400	
November 13	at Middle Tennessee	Horace Jones Field; Murfreesboro, TN	L 13–34	2,100	
November 20	Austin Peay	Memorial Stadium; Johnson City, TN	L 6–17	1,123	
November 25	at Chattanooga*	Chamberlain Field; Chattanooga, TN	L 14–21	4,200	
*Non-conference game; ^{†}Homecoming; Rankings from Associated Press Poll released prior to the game; Source:
