= Ben Hurt =

American football player and coach

Biographical details
- Born: c. 1933; Nashville, Tennessee, U.S.
- Died: November 12, 2017 (aged 84)

Playing career
- 1953–1956: Middle Tennessee

Coaching career (HC unless noted)
- 1965–1971: Houston (assistant)
- 1972–1974: Texas A&M (OC)
- 1975–1978: Middle Tennessee
- 1979–1995: Houston (assistant)

Head coaching record
- Overall: 12–31–1

Ben N. Hurt (c. 1933 – November 12, 2017) was an American college football player and coach. He served as the head football coach at Middle Tennessee State University from 1975 to 1978, compiling a record of 12–31–1.

== Head coaching record ==
Year	Team	Overall	Conference	Standing	Bowl/playoffs
Middle Tennessee Blue Raiders (Ohio Valley Conference) (1975–1978)
1975	Middle Tennessee	4–7	2–5	6th	
1976	Middle Tennessee	4–7	2–5	T–7th	
1977	Middle Tennessee	3–8	3–4	5th	
1978	Middle Tennessee	1–9–1	1–5	T–5th	
Middle Tennessee:		12–31–1	8–19		
Total:		12–31–1			
