= 1976 Maryland Eastern Shore Hawks football team =

American college football season

1976 Maryland Eastern Shore Hawks football
- Conference: Mid-Eastern Athletic Conference
- Record: 2–9 (1–5 MEAC)
- Head coach: Harold Gray (4th season)

1976 Mid-Eastern Athletic Conference football standings
	Conf.					Overall
Team	W		L		T	W		L		T
No. T–8 South Carolina State +	5	–	1	–	0	10	–	1	–	0
Morgan State +	5	–	1	–	0	6	–	4	–	0
North Carolina A&T	3	–	2	–	1	6	–	4	–	1
Howard	3	–	2	–	1	5	–	5	–	1
North Carolina Central	2	–	4	–	0	6	–	5	–	0
Delaware State	1	–	5	–	0	3	–	7	–	1
Maryland Eastern Shore	1	–	5	–	0	2	–	9	–	0
+ – Conference co-champions; Rankings from Associated Press poll

The 1976 Maryland Eastern Shore Hawks football team represented the University of Maryland Eastern Shore as a member of the Mid-Eastern Athletic Conference (MEAC) during the 1976 NCAA Division II football season. Led by fourth-year head coach Harold Gray, the Hawks compiled an overall record of 2–9, with a mark of 1–5 in conference play, and finished tied for sixth in the MEAC.

== Schedule ==
Date	Opponent	Site	Result	Attendance	Source
September 11	Towson State*	Princess Anne, MD	L 0–30		
September 18	Howard	Princess Anne, MD	L 6–42	1,500	
September 25	at Livingstone*	Alumni Memorial Stadium; Salisbury, NC	L 14–29		
October 2	at Delaware State	Alumni Stadium; Dover, DE	L 0–13		
October 16	at North Carolina A&T	World War Memorial Stadium; Greensboro, NC	L 13–37	9,000	
October 23	at North Carolina Central	O'Kelly Stadium; Durham, NC	W 21–19		
October 30	Fort Valley State*	Princess Anne, MD	L 2–21		
November 6	at South Carolina State	State College Stadium; Orangeburg, SC	L 0–47	14,103	
November 13	at Hampton*	Armstrong Stadium; Hampton, VA	W 12–3		
November 20	at Kentucky State*	Alumni Field; Frankfort, KY	L 0–13	2,000	
November 27	at Morgan State	Hughes Stadium; Baltimore, MD	L 10–56	2,000	
*Non-conference game
