= 1976 Texas Southern Tigers football team =

American college football season

1976 Texas Southern Tigers football
- Conference: Southwestern Athletic Conference
- Record: 2–9 (1–5 SWAC)
- Head coach: Wendell Mosley (1st season)
- Home stadium: Astrodome; Jeppesen Stadium

1976 Southwestern Athletic Conference football standings
	Conf.					Overall
Team	W		L		T	W		L		T
No. T–8 Alcorn State $	5	–	1	–	0	8	–	2	–	0
Southern	4	–	2	–	0	8	–	3	–	0
Grambling State	4	–	2	–	0	8	–	4	–	0
Prairie View A&M	3	–	3	–	0	6	–	5	–	0
Jackson State	3	–	3	–	0	5	–	4	–	0
Mississippi Valley State	1	–	5	–	0	4	–	6	–	0
Texas Southern	1	–	5	–	0	2	–	9	–	0
$ – Conference champion; Rankings from Associated Press poll

The 1976 Texas Southern Tigers football team was an American football team that represented Texas Southern University as a member of the Southwestern Athletic Conference (SWAC) during the 1976 NCAA Division II football season. Led by first-year head coach Wendell Mosley, the Tigers compiled an overall record of 2–9, with a mark of 1–5 in conference play, and finished tied for sixth in the SWAC.

== Schedule ==
Date	Opponent	Site	Result	Attendance	Source
September 4	Texas A&I*	Astrodome; Houston, TX	L 20–36	13,045	
September 11	vs. Bethune–Cookman*	Miami Orange Bowl; Miami, FL (Bicentennial Classic)	L 22–27	11,725	
September 19	Southern	Astrodome; Houston, TX	L 14–26	30,989	
September 25	No. 5 Tennessee State*	Jeppesen Stadium; Houston, TX	L 8–21	11,623–11,634	
October 9	at No. T–7 Alcorn State	Henderson Stadium; Lorman, MS	L 6–47	6,000	
October 16	at Bishop*	Cotton Bowl; Dallas, TX	L 14–15	2,851	
October 23	Mississippi Valley State	Jeppesen Stadium; Houston, TX	W 24–7	5,439	
October 30	Grambling State	Astrodome; Houston, TX	L 21–54	31,625	
November 6	at Jackson State	Mississippi Veterans Memorial Stadium; Jackson, MS	L 12–16	26,000	
November 13	at Langston*	Williams Stadium; Tulsa, OK	W 28–19	2,487	
November 20	Prairie View A&M	Astrodome; Houston, TX (rivalry)	L 15–22	10,892	
*Non-conference game; Rankings from AP Poll released prior to the game
