= 1976 Chattanooga Moccasins football team =

American college football season

1976 Chattanooga Moccasins football
- Conference: Independent
- Record: 6–4–1
- Head coach: Joe Morrison (4th season)
- Home stadium: Chamberlain Field

1976 NCAA Division II independents football records
	Conf.			Overall
Team	W	L	T	W		L		T
No. 2 Northern Michigan ^		–		11	–	2	–	0
No. 3 Akron ^		–		10	–	3	–	0
No. 7 UNLV ^		–		9	–	3	–	0
No. 4 Delaware ^		–		8	–	3	–	1
Nevada		–		8	–	3	–	0
Portland State		–		8	–	3	–	0
Tennessee State		–		7	–	2	–	1
American International		–		6	–	3	–	0
Northern Colorado		–		6	–	3	–	0
Madison		–		7	–	4	–	0
Santa Clara		–		7	–	4	–	0
Western Carolina		–		6	–	4	–	0
Chattanooga		–		6	–	4	–	1
Southern Connecticut State		–		5	–	4	–	0
Central State (OH)		–		6	–	5	–	0
Lehigh		–		6	–	5	–	0
Arkansas–Pine Bluff		–		5	–	5	–	0
Central Connecticut		–		5	–	5	–	0
Illinois College		–		4	–	4	–	1
Lafayette		–		5	–	5	–	0
Eastern Illinois		–		5	–	6	–	0
Bucknell		–		4	–	5	–	0
Youngstown State		–		4	–	6	–	0
Kentucky State		–		3	–	7	–	1
Nebraska–Omaha		–		3	–	8	–	0
Northeastern		–		2	–	7	–	0
^ – NCAA Division II playoff participant; Rankings from Associated Press poll

The 1976 Chattanooga Moccasins football team was an American football team that represented the University of Tennessee at Chattanooga as an independent during the 1976 NCAA Division II football season. In their fourth year under head coach Joe Morrison, the team compiled a 6–4–1 record.

== Schedule ==
Date	Opponent	Site	Result	Attendance	Source
September 11	at Illinois State	Hancock Stadium; Normal, IL	W 24–0	10,500	
September 18	Western Kentucky	Chamberlain Field; Chattanooga, TN	L 7–10	8,000	
September 25	at Western Carolina	E. J. Whitmire Stadium; Cullowhee, NC	W 28–14	9,755	
October 2	at Middle Tennessee	Horace Jones Field; Murfreesboro, TN	L 28–35	10,400	
October 9	at The Citadel	Johnson Hagood Stadium; Charleston, SC	L 10–14	17,985	
October 16	Jacksonville State^{†}	Chamberlain Field; Chattanooga, TN	W 14–7	7,500	
October 30	at Richmond	City Stadium; Richmond, VA	W 28–19	12,200	
November 6	Louisiana Tech	Chamberlain Field; Chattanooga, TN	L 7–49	6,000	
November 13	at Tennessee State	Hale Stadium; Nashville, TN	T 14–14	12,600	
November 20	Bowling Green	Chamberlain Field; Chattanooga, TN	W 49–29	4,600	
November 25	East Tennessee State	Chamberlain Field; Chattanooga, TN	W 23–14	4,200	
^{†}Homecoming
