= 1976 Madison Dukes football team =

American college football season

1976 Madison Dukes football
- Conference: Independent
- Record: 7–4
- Head coach: Challace McMillin (5th season)
- Home stadium: Madison Stadium

1976 NCAA Division II independents football records
	Conf.			Overall
Team	W	L	T	W		L		T
No. 2 Northern Michigan ^		–		11	–	2	–	0
No. 3 Akron ^		–		10	–	3	–	0
No. 7 UNLV ^		–		9	–	3	–	0
No. 4 Delaware ^		–		8	–	3	–	1
Nevada		–		8	–	3	–	0
Portland State		–		8	–	3	–	0
Tennessee State		–		7	–	2	–	1
American International		–		6	–	3	–	0
Northern Colorado		–		6	–	3	–	0
Madison		–		7	–	4	–	0
Santa Clara		–		7	–	4	–	0
Western Carolina		–		6	–	4	–	0
Chattanooga		–		6	–	4	–	1
Southern Connecticut State		–		5	–	4	–	0
Central State (OH)		–		6	–	5	–	0
Lehigh		–		6	–	5	–	0
Arkansas–Pine Bluff		–		5	–	5	–	0
Central Connecticut		–		5	–	5	–	0
Lafayette		–		5	–	5	–	0
Eastern Illinois		–		5	–	6	–	0
Bucknell		–		4	–	5	–	0
Youngstown State		–		4	–	6	–	0
Kentucky State		–		3	–	7	–	1
Nebraska–Omaha		–		3	–	8	–	0
Northeastern		–		2	–	7	–	0
^ – NCAA Division II playoff participant; Rankings from Associated Press poll

The 1976 Madison Dukes football team was an American football team that represented Madison College (now known as James Madison University) during the 1976 NCAA Division II football season as an independent. Led by fifth-year head coach Challace McMillin, the Dukes compiled a record of 7–4.

== Schedule ==
Date	Opponent	Site	Result	Attendance	Source
September 4	Glenville State	Madison Stadium; Harrisonburg, VA	W 30–14		
September 11	at Emory and Henry	Fullerton Field; Emory, VA	W 26–20		
September 18	Towson State	Madison Stadium; Harrisonburg, VA	W 28–26		
September 25	at Hampden–Sydney	Hundley Stadium; Hampden Sydney, VA	L 14–21	9,000	
October 2	vs. Shepherd	Cobourn Field; Martinsburg, WV (Civitan Bowl)	L 0–6		
October 9	California State (PA)	Madison Stadium; Harrisonburg, VA	W 35–17		
October 16	at Davidson	Richardson Stadium; Davidson, NC	W 17–12		
October 23	Frostburg State	Madison Stadium; Harrisonburg, VA	W 44–7	10,000	
October 30	at Randolph–Macon	Day Field; Ashland, VA	L 0–18	3,000	
November 6	at Salisbury State	Wicomico Stadium; Salisbury, MD	W 38–36	2,000	
November 13	Shippensburg	Madison Stadium; Harrisonburg, VA	L 17–21		
