= 1976 Mississippi Valley State Delta Devils football team =

American college football season

1976 Mississippi Valley State Delta Devils football
- Conference: Southwestern Athletic Conference
- Record: 4–6 (1–5 SWAC)
- Head coach: Davis Weathersby (7th season)
- Home stadium: Magnolia Stadium

1976 Southwestern Athletic Conference football standings
	Conf.					Overall
Team	W		L		T	W		L		T
No. T–8 Alcorn State $	5	–	1	–	0	8	–	2	–	0
Southern	4	–	2	–	0	8	–	3	–	0
Grambling State	4	–	2	–	0	8	–	4	–	0
Prairie View A&M	3	–	3	–	0	6	–	5	–	0
Jackson State	3	–	3	–	0	5	–	4	–	0
Mississippi Valley State	1	–	5	–	0	4	–	6	–	0
Texas Southern	1	–	5	–	0	2	–	9	–	0
$ – Conference champion; Rankings from Associated Press poll

The 1976 Mississippi Valley State Delta Devils football team represented Mississippi Valley State University as a member of the Southwestern Athletic Conference (SWAC) during the 1976 NCAA Division II football season. Led by seventh-year head coach Davis Weathersby, the Delta Devils compiled an overall record of 4–6, with a conference record of 1–5, and finished tied for sixth in the SWAC.

== Schedule ==
Date	Opponent	Site	Result	Attendance	Source
September 4	Langston*	Magnolia Stadium; Itta Bena, MS	W 13–0	7,000	
September 11	at Lincoln (MO)*	Jefferson City, MO	W 41–0	6,000	
September 21	at Arkansas–Pine Bluff*	Pumphrey Stadium; Pine Bluff, AR	W 23–21	7,500	
September 25	at Jackson State	Mississippi Veterans Memorial Stadium; Jackson, MS	L 12–13	21,000	
October 2	at Southern	University Stadium; Baton Rouge, LA	L 0–45	19,000	
October 16	Grambling State	Magnolia Stadium; Itta Bena, MS	L 7–20	5,231	
October 23	at Texas Southern	Jeppesen Stadium; Houston, TX	L 7–24	5,439	
October 30	Prairie View A&M	Magnolia Stadium; Itta Bena, MS	W 19–12	8,000	
November 6	No. 2 Alcorn State	Magnolia Stadium; Itta Bena, MS	L 7–42	7,000–9,000	
November 20	at Bishop*	Dallas, TX	L 6–12	2,100	
*Non-conference game; Rankings from AP Poll released prior to the game
