= 1976 Delaware State Hornets football team =

American college football season

1976 Delaware State Hornets football
- Conference: Mid-Eastern Athletic Conference
- Record: 3–7–1 (1–5 MEAC)
- Head coach: Ed Wyche (2nd season)
- Home stadium: Alumni Stadium

1976 Mid-Eastern Athletic Conference football standings
	Conf.					Overall
Team	W		L		T	W		L		T
No. T–8 South Carolina State +	5	–	1	–	0	10	–	1	–	0
Morgan State +	5	–	1	–	0	6	–	4	–	0
North Carolina A&T	3	–	2	–	1	6	–	4	–	1
Howard	3	–	2	–	1	5	–	5	–	1
North Carolina Central	2	–	4	–	0	6	–	5	–	0
Delaware State	1	–	5	–	0	3	–	7	–	1
Maryland Eastern Shore	1	–	5	–	0	2	–	9	–	0
+ – Conference co-champions; Rankings from Associated Press poll

The 1976 Delaware State Hornets football team represented Delaware State College—now known as Delaware State University—as a member of the Mid-Eastern Athletic Conference (MEAC) in the 1976 NCAA Division II football season. Led by second-year head coach Ed Wyche, the Hornets compiled an overall record of 3–7–1 and a mark of 1–5 in conference play, placing sixth out of seven teams in the MEAC.

== Schedule ==
Date	Opponent	Site	Result	Attendance	Source
September 4	Elizabeth City State*	Alumni Stadium; Dover, DE	W 9–7		
September 11	South Carolina State	Alumni Stadium; Dover, DE	L 0–30	2,700	
September 18	at Clarion*	Clarion, PA	L 0–16		
September 25	at Bethune–Cookman*	Gator Bowl; Daytona Beach, FL	L 7–41	7,500	
October 2	Maryland Eastern Shore	Alumni Stadium; Dover, DE	W 13–0		
October 9	at Howard	Howard Stadium; Washington, DC	L 0–32	1,200	
October 16	North Carolina Central	Alumni Stadium; Dover, DE	L 16–27		
October 23	at Morgan State	Hughes Stadium; Baltimore, MD	L 13–36		
October 30	at Kentucky State*	Frankfort, KY	T 0–0		
November 6	Shaw*	Alumni Stadium; Dover, DE	W 27–6		
November 13	at North Carolina A&T	World War Memorial Stadium; Greensboro, NC	L 6–30	5,000	
*Non-conference game
