= 1976 Howard Bison football team =

American college football season

1976 Howard Bison football
- Conference: Mid-Eastern Athletic Conference
- Record: 5–5–1 (3–2–1 MEAC)
- Head coach: Doug Porter (3rd season)
- Home stadium: RFK Stadium; Howard Stadium

1976 Mid-Eastern Athletic Conference football standings
	Conf.					Overall
Team	W		L		T	W		L		T
No. T–8 South Carolina State +	5	–	1	–	0	10	–	1	–	0
Morgan State +	5	–	1	–	0	6	–	4	–	0
North Carolina A&T	3	–	2	–	1	6	–	4	–	1
Howard	3	–	2	–	1	5	–	5	–	1
North Carolina Central	2	–	4	–	0	6	–	5	–	0
Delaware State	1	–	5	–	0	3	–	7	–	1
Maryland Eastern Shore	1	–	5	–	0	2	–	9	–	0
+ – Conference co-champions; Rankings from Associated Press poll

The 1976 Howard Bison football team represented Howard University as a member of the Mid-Eastern Athletic Conference (MEAC) during the 1976 NCAA Division II football season. Led by third-year head coach Doug Porter, the Bison compiled an overall record of 5–5–1, with a mark of 3–2–1 in conference play, and finished tied for third in the MEAC.

== Schedule ==
Date	Time	Opponent	Site	Result	Attendance	Source
September 10		Wayne State (MI)*	RFK Stadium; Washington, DC	L 14–31	6,000–6,300	
September 18		at Maryland Eastern Shore	Princess Anne, MD	W 42–6	1,500	
September 25		South Carolina State	RFK Stadium; Washington, DC	L 0–40	8,500	
October 2	7:00 p.m.	at Florida A&M*	Bragg Memorial Stadium; Tallahassee, FL	L 14–16	12,800–12,831	
October 9		Delaware State	Howard Stadium; Washington, DC	W 32–0	1,200	
October 16		at Virginia State*	Rogers Stadium; Ettrick, VA	W 42–15	7,158	
October 23		North Carolina A&T	RFK Stadium; Washington, DC	T 21–21	19,853–20,000	
October 30		at Hampton*	Armstrong Stadium; Hampton, VA (rivalry)	W 28–7	10,000	
November 6		at Southern*	University Stadium; Baton Rouge, LA	L 7–21	18,500	
November 13		North Carolina Central	RFK Stadium; Washington, DC	W 22–21	3,158	
November 20		Morgan State	RFK Stadium; Washington, DC (rivalry)	L 15–32	2,812–3,500	
*Non-conference game; All times are in Eastern time
