= 1976 Bucknell Bison football team =

American college football season

1976 Bucknell Bison football
- Conference: Independent
- Record: 4–5
- Head coach: Bob Curtis (2nd season)
- Captains: Karl Meyer; Jim Nesbitt; Kerry Snow
- Home stadium: Memorial Stadium

1976 NCAA Division II independents football records
	Conf.			Overall
Team	W	L	T	W		L		T
No. 2 Northern Michigan ^		–		11	–	2	–	0
No. 3 Akron ^		–		10	–	3	–	0
No. 7 UNLV ^		–		9	–	3	–	0
No. 4 Delaware ^		–		8	–	3	–	1
Nevada		–		8	–	3	–	0
Portland State		–		8	–	3	–	0
Tennessee State		–		7	–	2	–	1
American International		–		6	–	3	–	0
Northern Colorado		–		6	–	3	–	0
Madison		–		7	–	4	–	0
Santa Clara		–		7	–	4	–	0
Western Carolina		–		6	–	4	–	0
Chattanooga		–		6	–	4	–	1
Southern Connecticut State		–		5	–	4	–	0
Central State (OH)		–		6	–	5	–	0
Lehigh		–		6	–	5	–	0
Arkansas–Pine Bluff		–		5	–	5	–	0
Central Connecticut		–		5	–	5	–	0
Lafayette		–		5	–	5	–	0
Eastern Illinois		–		5	–	6	–	0
Bucknell		–		4	–	5	–	0
Youngstown State		–		4	–	6	–	0
Kentucky State		–		3	–	7	–	1
Nebraska–Omaha		–		3	–	8	–	0
Northeastern		–		2	–	7	–	0
^ – NCAA Division II playoff participant; Rankings from Associated Press poll

The 1976 Bucknell Bison football team was an American football team that represented Bucknell University as an independent during the 1976 NCAA Division II football season.

In their second year under head coach Bob Curtis, the Bison compiled a 4–5 record. Karl Meyer, Jim Nesbitt and Kerry Snow were the team captains.

Bucknell played its home games at Memorial Stadium on the university campus in Lewisburg, Pennsylvania.

== Schedule ==
Date	Opponent	Site	Result	Attendance	Source
September 18	Rutgers^{†}	Memorial Stadium; Lewisburg, PA	L 14–36	8,500	
September 25	at Davidson	Richardson Stadium; Davidson, NC	W 16–0	3,500	
October 2	C.W. Post	Memorial Stadium; Lewisburg, PA	L 6–17	3,000	
October 9	No. 9 Lehigh^	Memorial Stadium; Lewisburg, PA	W 3–0	5,000	
October 16	at West Chester	John A. Farrell Stadium; West Chester, PA	W 29–14	6,000	
October 23	at Gettysburg	Musselman Stadium; Gettysburg, PA	L 7–10	4,800	
October 30	Lafayette	Memorial Stadium; Lewisburg, PA	L 7–17	4,000	
November 6	Colgate	Memorial Stadium; Lewisburg, PA	L 13–24	3,500	
November 13	at Rochester	Fauver Stadium; Rochester, NY	W 21–7	1,500	
^{†}Homecoming; ^ Parents Weekend; Rankings from UPI Division II Coaches Poll
