= 1976 North Carolina Central Eagles football team =

American college football season

1976 North Carolina Central Eagles football
- Conference: Mid-Eastern Athletic Conference
- Record: 6–5 (2–4 MEAC)
- Head coach: Willie Smith (4th season)
- Home stadium: O'Kelly Stadium

1976 Mid-Eastern Athletic Conference football standings
	Conf.					Overall
Team	W		L		T	W		L		T
No. T–8 South Carolina State +	5	–	1	–	0	10	–	1	–	0
Morgan State +	5	–	1	–	0	6	–	4	–	0
North Carolina A&T	3	–	2	–	1	6	–	4	–	1
Howard	3	–	2	–	1	5	–	5	–	1
North Carolina Central	2	–	4	–	0	6	–	5	–	0
Delaware State	1	–	5	–	0	3	–	7	–	1
Maryland Eastern Shore	1	–	5	–	0	2	–	9	–	0
+ – Conference co-champions; Rankings from Associated Press poll

The 1976 North Carolina Central Eagles football team represented North Carolina Central University as a member of the Mid-Eastern Athletic Conference (MEAC) during the 1976 NCAA Division II football season. Led by fourth-year head coach Willie Smith, the Eagles compiled an overall record of 6–5, with a mark of 2–4 in conference play, and finished fifth in the MEAC.

== Schedule ==
Date	Opponent	Site	Result	Attendance	Source
September 11	Elizabeth City State*	O'Kelly Stadium; Durham, NC	W 34–0		
September 18	Winston-Salem State*	O'Kelly Stadium; Durham, NC	W 31–7		
September 25	at No. 2 Alcorn State*	Henderson Stadium; Lorman, MS	L 17–23	8,000	
October 2	at Morgan State	Hughes Stadium; Baltimore, MD	L 10–12	4,500	
October 9	Virginia State*	O'Kelly Stadium; Durham, NC	W 14–7		
October 16	at Delaware State	Alumni Stadium; Dover, DE	W 27–16		
October 23	Maryland Eastern Shore	O'Kelly Stadium; Durham, NC	L 19–21		
October 30	at South Carolina State	State College Stadium; Orangeburg, SC	L 0–30	4,320	
November 6	Johnson C. Smith*	O'Kelly Stadium; Durham, NC	W 10–3		
November 13	at Howard	RFK Stadium; Washington, DC	L 21–22	3,158	
November 20	North Carolina A&T	O'Kelly Stadium; Durham, NC (rivalry)	W 17–16	14,000	
*Non-conference game; Rankings from AP Poll released prior to the game
