= Henry Lattimore =

American football coach (1934–2010)

Biographical details
- Born: February 25, 1934; Natchez, Mississippi, U.S.
- Died: May 18, 2010 (aged 76); Houston, Texas, U.S.

Playing career
- c. 1952: Jackson State

Coaching career (HC unless noted)
- 1966: Jackson State (assistant)
- ?–1975: Texas Southern (DC)
- 1976–1977: Morgan State
- 1979–1990: North Carolina Central
- 1993–1994: Virginia Union

Head coaching record
- Overall: 84–81–5
- Bowls: 0–1
- Tournaments: 1–1 (NCAA D-II plauyoffs)

Accomplishments and honors

Championships
- 1 MEAC (1976); 1 CIAA (1980); 2 CIAA Southern Division (1981–1982)

Awards
- MEAC Coach of the Year (1976)

Henry C. Lattimore (February 25, 1934 – May 18, 2010) was an American football coach. He was the 10th head football coach at Morgan State University, coaching the Bears during the 1976 and 1977 seasons. Lattimore was also the 15th head coach for the North Carolina Central University Eagles located in Durham, North Carolina, and he held that position for twelve seasons, from 1979 until 1990. His coaching record at North Carolina Central was 72–53–3.

Lattimore died on May 18, 2010, in Houston, Texas, after suffering from Alzheimer's disease.

== Head coaching record ==
Year	Team	Overall	Conference	Standing	Bowl/playoffs
Morgan State Bears (Mid-Eastern Athletic Conference) (1976–1977)
1976	Morgan State	6–4	5–1	T–1st	
1977	Morgan State	4–6–1	3–3	4th	
Morgan State:		10–10–1	8–4		
North Carolina Central Eagles (Mid-Eastern Athletic Conference) (1979)
1979	North Carolina Central	2–8–1	1–4	6th	
North Carolina Central Eagles (Central Intercollegiate Athletic Conference) (1980–1990)
1980	North Carolina Central	7–5	7–0	1st	L Gold Bowl
1981	North Carolina Central	7–4	6–1	1st (Southern)	
1982	North Carolina Central	7–4	6–1	T–1st (Southern)	
1983	North Carolina Central	8–1–1	6–1	2nd (Southern)	
1984	North Carolina Central	7–3	5–2	2nd (Southern)	
1985	North Carolina Central	4–6	4–4	3rd (Southern)	
1986	North Carolina Central	6–4	6–1	2nd (Southern)	
1987	North Carolina Central	6–5	3–4	4th (Southern)	
1988	North Carolina Central	9–2–1	4–1–1	T–2nd (Southern)	L NCAA Division II Quarterfinal
1989	North Carolina Central	5–5	3–3	2nd (Southern)	
1990	North Carolina Central	3–7	2–4	T–2nd (Southern)	
North Carolina Central:		71–54–3	53–26–1		
Virginia Union Panthers (Central Intercollegiate Athletic Conference) (1993–1994)
1993	Virginia Union	2–8–1	2–5–1	T–8th	
1994	Virginia Union	1–9	1–7	10th	
Virginia Union:		3–17–1	3–12–1		
Total:		84–81–5			
National championship Conference title Conference division title or championship game berth
