= 1976 Nevada Wolf Pack football team =

American college football season

1976 Nevada Wolf Pack football
- Conference: Independent
- Record: 8–3
- Head coach: Chris Ault (1st season)
- Offensive scheme: Wing T
- Base defense: 6–2 or 5–2
- Home stadium: Mackay Stadium

1976 NCAA Division II independents football records
	Conf.			Overall
Team	W	L	T	W		L		T
No. 2 Northern Michigan ^		–		11	–	2	–	0
No. 3 Akron ^		–		10	–	3	–	0
No. 7 UNLV ^		–		9	–	3	–	0
No. 4 Delaware ^		–		8	–	3	–	1
Nevada		–		8	–	3	–	0
Portland State		–		8	–	3	–	0
Tennessee State		–		7	–	2	–	1
American International		–		6	–	3	–	0
Northern Colorado		–		6	–	3	–	0
Madison		–		7	–	4	–	0
Santa Clara		–		7	–	4	–	0
Western Carolina		–		6	–	4	–	0
Chattanooga		–		6	–	4	–	1
Southern Connecticut State		–		5	–	4	–	0
Central State (OH)		–		6	–	5	–	0
Lehigh		–		6	–	5	–	0
Arkansas–Pine Bluff		–		5	–	5	–	0
Central Connecticut		–		5	–	5	–	0
Illinois College		–		4	–	4	–	1
Lafayette		–		5	–	5	–	0
Eastern Illinois		–		5	–	6	–	0
Bucknell		–		4	–	5	–	0
Youngstown State		–		4	–	6	–	0
Kentucky State		–		3	–	7	–	1
Nebraska–Omaha		–		3	–	8	–	0
Northeastern		–		2	–	7	–	0
^ – NCAA Division II playoff participant; Rankings from Associated Press poll

The 1976 Nevada Wolf Pack football team represented the University of Nevada, Reno as an independent during the 1976 NCAA Division II football season. Led by first-year head coach Chris Ault, the Wolf Pack compiled a record of 8–3. The team played home games at Mackay Stadium in Reno, Nevada.

== Schedule ==
Date	Opponent	Site	Result	Attendance	Source
September 11	Cal State Hayward	Mackay Stadium; Reno, NV	W 30–13	5,300–5,400	
September 18	Willamette	McCulloch Stadium; Salem, OR	W 39–6	1,500	
September 25	Idaho State	ASISU Minidome; Pocatello, ID	L 22–27	7,672–7,762	
October 2	Montana Tech	Mackay Stadium; Reno, NV	W 57–7	5,000	
October 9	Santa Clara^{†}	Mackay Stadium; Reno, NV	W 56–39	7,500–8,000	
October 16	Simon Fraser	Mackay Stadium; Reno, NV	W 44–13	5,000	
October 23	at Boise State	Bronco Stadium; Boise, ID (rivalry)	L 8–26	16,587	
October 30	Chico State	Mackay Stadium; Reno, NV	W 43–14	3,600–5,600	
November 6	Sacramento State	Mackay Stadium; Reno, NV	W 42–27	5,800	
November 13	Portland State	Mackay Stadium; Reno, NV	W 35–22	7,000	
November 20	at No. 7 UNLV	Las Vegas Stadium; East Las Vegas, NV (Fremont Cannon)	L 33–49	14,270	
^{†}Homecoming; Rankings from Associated Press Poll released prior to the game
