= 1976 Middle Tennessee Blue Raiders football team =

American college football season

1976 Middle Tennessee Blue Raiders football
- Conference: Ohio Valley Conference
- Record: 4–7 (2–5 OVC)
- Head coach: Ben Hurt (2nd season)
- Captains: Dunster; Wright; Wright
- Home stadium: Horace Jones Field

1976 Ohio Valley Conference football standings
	Conf.					Overall
Team	W		L		T	W		L		T
No. 5 Eastern Kentucky $^	6	–	1	–	0	8	–	3	–	0
Tennessee Tech	5	–	2	–	0	8	–	3	–	0
Murray State	4	–	3	–	0	5	–	6	–	0
Austin Peay	3	–	4	–	0	5	–	6	–	0
Western Kentucky	3	–	4	–	0	4	–	5	–	1
East Tennessee State	3	–	4	–	0	3	–	7	–	0
Middle Tennessee	2	–	5	–	0	4	–	7	–	0
Morehead State	2	–	5	–	0	2	–	9	–	0
$ – Conference champion; ^ – NCAA Division II playoff participant; Morehead State record adjusted for forfeit to Marshall; Rankings from Associated Press poll

The 1976 Middle Tennessee Blue Raiders football team represented Middle Tennessee State University—as a member of the Ohio Valley Conference (OVC) during the 1976 NCAA Division II football season. Led by second-year head coach Ben Hurt, the Blue Raiders compiled a record an overall record of 4–7 with a mark of 2–5 in conference play. The team's captains were Dunster, Wright, and Wright.

== Schedule ==
Date	Opponent	Site	Result	Attendance	Source
September 4	vs. Tennessee State*	Dudley Field; Nashville, TN	L 17–26	18,361	
September 11	at Carson–Newman*	Burke–Tarr Stadium; Jefferson City, TN	W 35–20	4,000	
September 18	Tennessee–Martin*	Horace Jones Field; Murfreesboro, TN	L 3–38	9,000	
September 25	Morehead State	Horace Jones Field; Murfreesboro, TN	W 21–0	6,800	
October 4	Chattanooga*	Horace Jones Field; Murfreesboro, TN	W 35–28	10,400	
October 9	at Eastern Kentucky	Hanger Field; Richmond, KY	L 14–40	12,700	
October 16	at Murray State	Cutchin Stadium; Murray, KY	L 20–24	12,500	
October 30	Austin Peay	Horace Jones Field; Murfreesboro, TN	L 9–21	5,500	
November 6	at Western Kentucky	L. T. Smith Stadium; Bowling Green, KY (rivalry)	L 7–38	20,000	
November 13	East Tennessee State	Horace Jones Field; Murfreesboro, TN	W 34–13	2,100	
November 20	at Tennessee Tech	Tucker Stadium; Cookeville, TN	L 10–33	8,200	
*Non-conference game
