= 1976 Lafayette Leopards football team =

American college football season

1976 Lafayette Leopards football
- Conference: Independent
- Record: 5–5
- Head coach: Neil Putnam (6th season)
- Captains: George O'Shaughnessy; Matt Walsh
- Home stadium: Fisher Field

1976 NCAA Division II independents football records
	Conf.			Overall
Team	W	L	T	W		L		T
No. 2 Northern Michigan ^		–		11	–	2	–	0
No. 3 Akron ^		–		10	–	3	–	0
No. 7 UNLV ^		–		9	–	3	–	0
No. 4 Delaware ^		–		8	–	3	–	1
Nevada		–		8	–	3	–	0
Portland State		–		8	–	3	–	0
Tennessee State		–		7	–	2	–	1
American International		–		6	–	3	–	0
Northern Colorado		–		6	–	3	–	0
Madison		–		7	–	4	–	0
Santa Clara		–		7	–	4	–	0
Western Carolina		–		6	–	4	–	0
Chattanooga		–		6	–	4	–	1
Southern Connecticut State		–		5	–	4	–	0
Central State (OH)		–		6	–	5	–	0
Lehigh		–		6	–	5	–	0
Arkansas–Pine Bluff		–		5	–	5	–	0
Central Connecticut		–		5	–	5	–	0
Lafayette		–		5	–	5	–	0
Eastern Illinois		–		5	–	6	–	0
Bucknell		–		4	–	5	–	0
Youngstown State		–		4	–	6	–	0
Kentucky State		–		3	–	7	–	1
Nebraska–Omaha		–		3	–	8	–	0
Northeastern		–		2	–	7	–	0
^ – NCAA Division II playoff participant; Rankings from Associated Press poll

The 1976 Lafayette Leopards football team was an American football team that represented Lafayette College as an independent during the 1976 NCAA Division II football season. In their sixth year under head coach Neil Putnam, the Leopards compiled a 5–5 record. Matt Walsh and George O'Shaughnessy were the team captains. Lafayette played its home games at Fisher Field on College Hill in Easton, Pennsylvania.

== Schedule ==
Date	Opponent	Site	Result	Attendance	Source
September 11	at Army	Michie Stadium; West Point, NY	L 6–16	20,865	
September 18	Merchant Marine	Fisher Field; Easton, PA	L 7–10	2,000	
September 25	at Columbia	Baker Field; New York, NY	L 31–38	4,035	
October 2	Wagner	Fisher Field; Easton, PA	W 44–21	3,000	
October 16	Penn	Fisher Field; Easton, PA	L 14–15	8,000–10,000	
October 23	Colgate	Fisher Field; Easton, PA	L 14–24	3,000	
October 30	at Bucknell	Memorial Stadium; Lewisburg, PA	W 17–7	4,000	
November 6	at Gettysburg	Musselman Stadium; Gettysburg, PA	W 30–3	3,100–4,100	
November 13	at Davidson	Richardson Stadium; Davidson, NC	W 30–20	1,000–2,000	
November 20	Lehigh	Fisher Field; Easton, PA (The Rivalry)	W 21–17	15,000	
