= Roy Frazier =

American football player and coach (1942–2002)

Biographical details
- Born: June 6, 1942
- Died: November 14, 2002 (aged 60); Sumner County, Tennessee, U.S.

Playing career
- 1960: Vanderbilt

Coaching career (HC unless noted)
- 1965–1968: East Tennessee State (GA)
- 1969–1971: Vanderbilt (assistant)
- 1973–1977: East Tennessee State

Head coaching record
- Overall: 16–36–2

Roy Kenneth Frazier (June 6, 1942 – November 14, 2002) was an American football player and coach. He served as the head football coach at East Tennessee State University in Johnson City, Tennessee from 1973 to 1977, compiling a record of 16–36–2.

== Head coaching record ==
Year	Team	Overall	Conference	Standing	Bowl/playoffs
East Tennessee State Buccaneers (Ohio Valley Conference) (1973)
1973	East Tennessee State	4–7	3–4	T–5th	
1974	East Tennessee State	4–6–1	3–3–1	5th	
1975	East Tennessee State	2–8–1	1–5–1	7th	
1976	East Tennessee State	3–7	3–4	T–4th	
1977	East Tennessee State	3–8	2–5	7th	
East Tennessee State:		16–36–2	11–20		
Total:		16–36–2			
