= 1976 Morgan State Bears football team =

American college football season

1976 Morgan State Bears football

MEAC co-champion
- Conference: Mid-Eastern Athletic Conference
- Record: 6–4 (5–1 MEAC)
- Head coach: Henry Lattimore (1st season)
- Defensive coordinator: Thomas Morris (4th season)
- Home stadium: Hughes Stadium

1976 Mid-Eastern Athletic Conference football standings
	Conf.					Overall
Team	W		L		T	W		L		T
No. T–8 South Carolina State +	5	–	1	–	0	10	–	1	–	0
Morgan State +	5	–	1	–	0	6	–	4	–	0
North Carolina A&T	3	–	2	–	1	6	–	4	–	1
Howard	3	–	2	–	1	5	–	5	–	1
North Carolina Central	2	–	4	–	0	6	–	5	–	0
Delaware State	1	–	5	–	0	3	–	7	–	1
Maryland Eastern Shore	1	–	5	–	0	2	–	9	–	0
+ – Conference co-champions; Rankings from Associated Press poll

The 1976 Morgan State Bears football team represented Morgan State University as a member of the Mid-Eastern Athletic Conference (MEAC) during the 1976 NCAA Division II football season. Led by first-year head coach Henry Lattimore, the Bears compiled an overall record of 6–4 and a mark of 5–1 in conference play, and finished as MEAC co-champion.

The game played in September in Tokyo against Morgan State was the first regular-season NCAA game played in Japan. (Note: Despite incorrect reporting otherwise, this was not the first college football game played outside the Western Hemisphere by any stretch. Japan universities began forming their own college football teams since 1934. In 1971, the Utah State Aggies became the first American college football team to play in Japan, in a series of games against teams of Japan's college all-stars. January 1976 saw the beginning of the Japan Bowl, a post-season college football all-star game played in Japan each January from 1976 to 1993. However, this was the first time two NCAA football teams played each other in Japan, presaging the Mirage Bowl which began in 1977.)

== Schedule ==
Date	Opponent	Site	Result	Attendance	Source
September 11	at Virginia State*	Rogers Stadium; Ettrick, VA	W 28–23	8,500	
September 23	vs. Grambling State*	Korakuen Stadium; Tokyo, Japan (Pioneer Bowl)	L 16–42	50,000	
October 2	North Carolina Central	Hughes Stadium; Baltimore, MD	W 12–10	4,500	
October 17	South Carolina State	Hughes Stadium; Baltimore, MD	L 0–17	6,500	
October 23	Delaware State^{†}	Hughes Stadium; Baltimore, MD	W 36–13	10,500	
October 30	at North Carolina A&T	World War Memorial Stadium; Greensboro, NC	W 45–16	21,500–25,000	
November 6	Virginia Union*	Hughes Stadium; Baltimore, MD	L 13–20	4,000	
November 13	at East Stroudsburg*	East Stroudsburg, PA	L 0–23	6,500	
November 20	at Howard	RFK Stadium; Washington, DC (rivalry)	W 34–15	2,812–3,500	
November 27	Maryland Eastern Shore	Hughes Stadium; Baltimore, MD	W 56–10	2,000	
*Non-conference game; ^{†}Homecoming
