= 1976 Southern Jaguars football team =

American college football season

1976 Southern Jaguars football
- Conference: Southwestern Athletic Conference
- Record: 8–3 (4–2 SWAC)
- Head coach: Charles Bates (5th season)
- Home stadium: University Stadium

1976 Southwestern Athletic Conference football standings
	Conf.					Overall
Team	W		L		T	W		L		T
No. T–8 Alcorn State $	5	–	1	–	0	8	–	2	–	0
Southern	4	–	2	–	0	8	–	3	–	0
Grambling State	4	–	2	–	0	8	–	4	–	0
Prairie View A&M	3	–	3	–	0	6	–	5	–	0
Jackson State	3	–	3	–	0	5	–	4	–	0
Mississippi Valley State	1	–	5	–	0	4	–	6	–	0
Texas Southern	1	–	5	–	0	2	–	9	–	0
$ – Conference champion; Rankings from Associated Press poll

The 1976 Southern Jaguars football team represented Southern University as a member of the Southwestern Athletic Conference (SWAC) during the 1976 NCAA Division II football season. Led by fifth-year head coach Charles Bates, the Jaguars compiled an overall record of 8–3, with a conference record of 4–2, and finished tied for second in the SWAC.

== Schedule ==
Date	Opponent	Rank	Site	Result	Attendance	Source
September 11	at Tuskegee*		Cramton Bowl; Montgomery, AL	W 20–7		
September 19	at Texas Southern		Astrodome; Houston, TX	W 26–14	30,989	
September 25	Prairie View A&M		University Stadium; Baton Rouge, LA	W 7–6	20,000	
October 2	Mississippi Valley State		University Stadium; Baton Rouge, LA	W 45–0		
October 9	at Bishop*	No. 6	P.C. Cobb Stadium; Dallas, TX	W 41–14		
October 16	Jackson State	No. 3	University Stadium; Baton Rouge, LA (rivalry)	W 20–6		
October 23	at No. 3 Alcorn State	No. 2	Henderson Stadium; Lorman, MS	L 0–3	12,000	
October 30	at No. 7 Tennessee State*	No. T–4	Hale Stadium; Nashville, TN	L 7–21	16,000	
November 6	Howard*		University Stadium; Baton Rouge, LA	W 21–7		
November 13	Florida A&M*		University Stadium; Baton Rouge, LA	W 24–6	14,500	
November 27	vs. Grambling State		Louisiana Superdome; New Orleans, LA (Bayou Classic)	L 2–10	76,188	
*Non-conference game; Rankings from AP Poll released prior to the game
