= 1976 Southwest Texas State Bobcats football team =

American college football season

1976 Southwest Texas State Bobcats football
- Conference: Lone Star Conference
- Record: 5–5 (4–3 LSC)
- Head coach: Bill Miller (12th season)
- Home stadium: Evans Field

1976 Lone Star Conference football standings
	Conf.					Overall
Team	W		L		T	W		L		T
No. 1 Texas A&I $^	7	–	0	–	0	13	–	0	–	0
No. 6 Abilene Christian	5	–	2	–	0	8	–	2	–	0
East Texas State	4	–	3	–	0	5	–	3	–	1
Southwest Texas State	4	–	3	–	0	5	–	5	–	0
Angelo State	3	–	3	–	1	5	–	5	–	1
Sam Houston State	2	–	5	–	0	3	–	5	–	1
Howard Payne	1	–	5	–	1	1	–	8	–	1
Stephen F. Austin	1	–	6	–	0	2	–	9	–	1
$ – Conference champion; ^ – NAIA Division I playoff participant; Rankings from NAIA Division I poll

The 1976 Southwest Texas State Bobcats football team was an American football team that represented Southwest Texas State University (now known as Texas State University) during the 1976 NAIA Division I football season as a member of the Lone Star Conference (LSC). In their 12th year under head coach Bill Miller, the team compiled an overall record of 5–5, with a mark of 4–3 in conference play.

== Schedule ==
Date	Opponent	Site	Result	Source
September 11	Texas Lutheran*	Evans Field; San Marcos, TX	L 9–13	
September 18	at Cameron State*	Cameron Stadium; Lawton, OK	W 33–14	
September 25	Angelo State	Evans Field; San Marcos, TX	L 12–14	
October 2	at Abilene Christian	Shotwell Stadium; Abilene, TX	W 22–16	
October 9	Prairie View A&M*	Evans Field; San Marcos, TX	L 25–45	
October 16	Stephen F. Austin	Evans Field; San Marcos, TX	W 34–0	
October 23	at Sam Houston State	Pritchett Field; Huntsville, TX (rivalry)	W 40–10	
October 30	at East Texas State	Memorial Stadium; Commerce, TX	L 8–23	
November 6	Howard Payne	Evans Field; San Marcos, TX	W 27–25	
November 20	Texas A&I	Evans Field; San Marcos, TX	L 6–44	
*Non-conference game
