= 1976 Cornell Big Red football team =

American college football season

1976 Cornell Big Red football
- Conference: Ivy League
- Record: 2–7 (2–5 Ivy)
- Head coach: George Seifert (2nd season)
- Home stadium: Schoellkopf Field

1976 Ivy League football standings
	Conf.					Overall
Team	W		L		T	W		L		T
Yale +	6	–	1	–	0	8	–	1	–	0
Brown +	6	–	1	–	0	8	–	1	–	0
Harvard	4	–	3	–	0	6	–	3	–	0
Dartmouth	4	–	3	–	0	6	–	3	–	0
Columbia	2	–	5	–	0	3	–	6	–	0
Penn	2	–	5	–	0	3	–	6	–	0
Princeton	2	–	5	–	0	2	–	7	–	0
Cornell	2	–	5	–	0	2	–	7	–	0
+ – Conference co-champions

The 1976 Cornell Big Red football team was an American football team that represented Cornell University in the Ivy League during the 1976 NCAA Division I football season. In its second and final season under head coach George Seifert, the Big Red compiled a 2–7 record and was outscored 177 to 109. Team captains were chosen on a game-by-game basis, and home games were played on campus at Schoellkopf Field in Ithaca, New York.

Cornell's 2–5 conference record placed it in a four-way tie for fifth place, at the bottom of the Ivy League standings. The Big Red were outscored 131 to 75 by Ivy opponents.

With an overall record of 3–15 (.167), Seifert was fired days after the final game, a 31–13 win over Penn, and returned to Stanford as the defensive backs coach under new head coach Bill Walsh.

== Schedule ==
Date	Opponent	Site	Result	Attendance	Source
September 18	Princeton	Schoellkopf Field; Ithaca, NY	L 0–3	14,000	
September 25	Colgate*	Schoellkopf Field; Ithaca, NY (rivalry)	L 20–25	10,000	
October 2	at Rutgers*	Rutgers Stadium; Piscataway, NJ	L 14–21	16,000	
October 9	at Harvard	Harvard Stadium; Boston, MA	W 9–3	8,000	
October 16	Brown^{†}	Schoellkopf Field; Ithaca, NY	L 12–28	12,000	
October 23	Dartmouth	Schoellkopf Field; Ithaca, NY (rivalry)	L 0–35	11,000	
October 30	at Yale	Yale Bowl; New Haven, CT	L 6–14	22,519	
November 6	at Columbia	Baker Field; New York, NY (rivalry)	L 17–35	5,120	
November 13	Penn	Schoellkopf Field; Ithaca, NY (rivalry)	W 31–13	9,000	
*Non-conference game; ^{†}Homecoming
