= 1976 Texas A&I Javelinas football team =

American college football season

1976 Texas A&I Javelinas football

NAIA Division I national champion LSC champion

Champion Bowl, W 26–0 vs. Central Arkansas
- Conference: Lone Star Conference
- Record: 13–0 (7–0 LSC)
- Head coach: Gil Steinke (23rd season)
- Defensive coordinator: Fred Jonas (8th season)
- Captains: Leonard Avery; Larry McFarland; Richard Ritchie
- Home stadium: Javelina Stadium

1976 Lone Star Conference football standings
	Conf.					Overall
Team	W		L		T	W		L		T
No. 1 Texas A&I $^	7	–	0	–	0	13	–	0	–	0
No. 6 Abilene Christian	5	–	2	–	0	8	–	2	–	0
East Texas State	4	–	3	–	0	5	–	3	–	1
Southwest Texas State	4	–	3	–	0	5	–	5	–	0
Angelo State	3	–	3	–	1	5	–	5	–	1
Sam Houston State	2	–	5	–	0	3	–	5	–	1
Howard Payne	1	–	5	–	1	1	–	8	–	1
Stephen F. Austin	1	–	6	–	0	2	–	9	–	1
$ – Conference champion; ^ – NAIA Division I playoff participant; Rankings from NAIA Division I poll

The 1976 Texas A&I Javelinas football team was an American football team that represented the Texas College of Arts and Industries (now known as Texas A&M University–Kingsville) as a member of the Lone Star Conference during the 1976 NAIA Division I football season. In its 23rd year under head coach Gil Steinke, the team compiled a perfect 13–0 record (7–0 against conference opponents), won the Lone Star Conference championship, and defeated Central Arkansas in the Champion Bowl to win the NAIA national championship.

The team played its home games at Javelina Stadium in Kingsville, Texas.

== Schedule ==
Date	Opponent	Site	Result	Attendance	Source
September 4	at Texas Southern*	Astrodome; Houston, TX	W 36–20		
September 11	Slippery Rock*	Javelina Stadium; Kingsville, TX	W 58–7		
September 18	at Hawaii*	Aloha Stadium; Halawa, HI	W 56–21	22,708	
September 25	Abilene Christian	Javelina Stadium; Kingsville, TX	W 38–10		
October 2	at Stephen F. Austin	Nacogdoches, TX	W 77–7		
October 9	at East Texas State	Commerce, TX	W 37–0		
October 16	Western New Mexico*	Javelina Stadium; Kingsville, TX	W 63–2		
October 23	at Angelo State	San Angelo, TX	W 20–10		
November 6	Sam Houston State	Javelina Stadium; Kingsville, TX	W 41–10	16,000	
November 13	Howard Payne	Javelina Stadium; Kingsville, TX	W 40–0		
November 20	at Southwest Texas State	Evans Field; San Marcos, TX	W 44–6		
December 4	Western State (CO)	Javelina Stadium; Kingsville, TX (NAIA Division I semifinal)	W 57–14	10,001	
December 11	Central Arkansas	Javelina Stadium; Kingsville, TX (Champion Bowl)	W 26–0	9,562	
*Non-conference game
