= 1976 Penn Quakers football team =

American college football season

1976 Penn Quakers football
- Conference: Ivy League
- Record: 3–6 (2–5 Ivy)
- Head coach: Harry Gamble (6th season)
- Defensive coordinator: Otto Kneidinger (6th season)
- Captains: Robert Graustein; Robert Mardula; William Petuskey
- Home stadium: Franklin Field

1976 Ivy League football standings
	Conf.					Overall
Team	W		L		T	W		L		T
Yale +	6	–	1	–	0	8	–	1	–	0
Brown +	6	–	1	–	0	8	–	1	–	0
Harvard	4	–	3	–	0	6	–	3	–	0
Dartmouth	4	–	3	–	0	6	–	3	–	0
Columbia	2	–	5	–	0	3	–	6	–	0
Penn	2	–	5	–	0	3	–	6	–	0
Princeton	2	–	5	–	0	2	–	7	–	0
Cornell	2	–	5	–	0	2	–	7	–	0
+ – Conference co-champions

The 1976 Penn Quakers football team was an American football team that represented the University of Pennsylvania during the 1976 NCAA Division I football season. Penn tied for last place in the Ivy League.

In their sixth year under head coach Harry Gamble, the Quakers compiled a 3–6 record and were outscored 159 to 90. Robert Graustein, Robert Mardula and William Petuskey were the team captain.

Penn's 2–5 conference record placed it in a four-way tie for fifth place, at the bottom of the Ivy League standings. The Quakers were outscored 121 to 55 by Ivy opponents.

Penn played its home games at Franklin Field adjacent to the university's campus in Philadelphia, Pennsylvania.

== Schedule ==
Date	Opponent	Site	Result	Attendance	Source
September 18	at Dartmouth	Memorial Field; Hanover, NH	L 0–20	11,300	
September 24	Lehigh*	Franklin Field; Philadelphia, PA	L 20–24	9,300–9,305	
October 2	Columbia	Franklin Field; Philadelphia, PA	L 10–14	6,688	
October 9	at Brown	Brown Stadium; Providence, RI	W 7–6	1,200	
October 16	at Lafayette*^{†}	Fisher Field; Easton, PA	W 15–14	8,000–10,000	
October 23	Yale	Franklin Field; Philadelphia, PA	L 7–21	15,101	
October 30	at Princeton	Palmer Stadium; Princeton, NJ (rivalry)	W 10–9	10,000	
November 6	Harvard	Franklin Field; Philadelphia, PA (rivalry)	L 8–20	8,423	
November 13	at Cornell	Schoellkopf Field; Ithaca, NY (rivalry)	L 13–31	9,000	
*Non-conference game; ^{†}Homecoming
