= 1976 Prairie View A&M Panthers football team =

American college football season

1976 Prairie View A&M Panthers football
- Conference: Southwestern Athletic Conference
- Record: 6–5 (3–3 SWAC)
- Head coach: Hoover J. Wright (7th season)
- Home stadium: Edward L. Blackshear Field

1976 Southwestern Athletic Conference football standings
	Conf.					Overall
Team	W		L		T	W		L		T
No. T–8 Alcorn State $	5	–	1	–	0	8	–	2	–	0
Southern	4	–	2	–	0	8	–	3	–	0
Grambling State	4	–	2	–	0	8	–	4	–	0
Prairie View A&M	3	–	3	–	0	6	–	5	–	0
Jackson State	3	–	3	–	0	5	–	4	–	0
Mississippi Valley State	1	–	5	–	0	4	–	6	–	0
Texas Southern	1	–	5	–	0	2	–	9	–	0
$ – Conference champion; Rankings from Associated Press poll

The 1976 Prairie View A&M Panthers football team represented Prairie View A&M University as a member of the Southwestern Athletic Conference (SWAC) during the 1976 NCAA Division II football season. Led by seventh-year head coach Hoover J. Wright, the Panthers compiled an overall record of 6–5, with a conference record of 3–3, and finished tied for fourth in the SWAC.

== Schedule ==
Date	Opponent	Site	Result	Attendance	Source
September 11	vs. East Texas State*	Cotton Bowl; Dallas, TX	L 27–35	10,587	
September 18	at Jackson State	Mississippi Veterans Memorial Stadium; Jackson, MS	L 3–14	20,000	
September 25	at Southern	University Stadium; Baton Rouge, LA	L 6–7	20,000	
October 9	at Southwest Texas State*	Evans Field; San Marcos, TX	W 45–25	15,000	
October 16	Texas Lutheran*	Edward L. Blackshear Field; Prairie View, TX	L 14–48	5,000	
October 23	at Bishop*	P.C. Cobb Stadium; Dallas, TX	W 22–14	12,000	
October 30	at Mississippi Valley State	Magnolia Stadium; Itta Bena, MS	L 12–19	8,000	
November 6	Arkansas–Pine Bluff*	Edward L. Blackshear Field; Prairie View, TX	W 28–13	11,000	
November 13	No. 2 Alcorn State	Edward L. Blackshear Field; Prairie View, TX	W 14–6	4,000	
November 20	at Texas Southern	Astrodome; Houston, TX (rivalry)	W 22–15	10,892	
December 4	at Grambling State	Grambling Stadium; Grambling, LA	W 0–0 (forfeit win)		
*Non-conference game; Rankings from AP Poll released prior to the game
