= 1976 Grambling State Tigers football team =

American college football season

1976 Grambling State Tigers football
- Conference: Southwestern Athletic Conference
- Record: 8–4 (4–2 SWAC)
- Head coach: Eddie Robinson (34th season)
- Home stadium: Grambling Stadium

1976 Southwestern Athletic Conference football standings
	Conf.					Overall
Team	W		L		T	W		L		T
No. T–8 Alcorn State $	5	–	1	–	0	8	–	2	–	0
Southern	4	–	2	–	0	8	–	3	–	0
Grambling State	4	–	2	–	0	8	–	4	–	0
Prairie View A&M	3	–	3	–	0	6	–	5	–	0
Jackson State	3	–	3	–	0	5	–	4	–	0
Mississippi Valley State	1	–	5	–	0	4	–	6	–	0
Texas Southern	1	–	5	–	0	2	–	9	–	0
$ – Conference champion; Rankings from Associated Press poll

The 1976 Grambling Tigers football team was an American football team that represented Grambling State University as a member of the Southwestern Athletic Conference (SWAC) during the 1976 NCAA Division II football season. In its 34th season under head coach Eddie Robinson, Grambling State compiled an 8–4 record (4–2 against conference opponents), finished in second place in the SWAC, and outscored opponents by a total of 313 to 202.

The game played in September in Tokyo against Morgan State was the first regular-season NCAA game played in Japan. (Note: Despite incorrect reporting otherwise, this was not the first college football game played outside the Western Hemisphere by any stretch. Japan universities began forming their own college football teams since 1934. In 1971, the Utah State Aggies became the first American college football team to play in Japan, in a series of games against teams of Japan's college all-stars. January 1976 saw the beginning of the Japan Bowl, a post-season college football all-star game played in Japan each January from 1976 to 1993. However, this was the first time two NCAA football teams played each other in Japan, presaging the Mirage Bowl which began in 1977.)

== Schedule ==
Date	Opponent	Site	Result	Attendance	Source
September 11	vs. Alcorn State	State Fair Stadium; Shreveport, LA	L 0–24	12,000–22,000	
September 18	at Temple*	Veterans Stadium; Philadelphia, PA	L 30–31	16,646	
September 23	vs. Morgan State*	Korakuen Stadium; Tokyo, Japan	W 42–16	50,000	
October 2	at Hawaii*	Aloha Stadium; Halawa, HI	W 34–23	20,891–26,000	
October 9	Tennessee State*	Grambling Stadium; Grambling, LA	L 20–34	16,221	
October 16	at Mississippi Valley State	Magnolia Stadium; Itta Bena, MS	W 20–7	5,231	
October 23	Jackson State	Grambling Stadium; Grambling, LA	W 28–6	14,443	
October 30	at Texas Southern	Houston Astrodome; Houston, TX	W 54–21	31,625	
November 6	vs. North Carolina A&T*	Pontiac Silverdome; Pontiac, MI	W 34–18	23,606–23,607	
November 13	Norfolk State*	Grambling Stadium; Grambling, LA	W 41–19	12,171	
November 27	vs. Southern	Louisiana Superdome; New Orleans, LA (Bayou Classic)	W 10–2	76,188	
December 4	Prairie View A&M	Grambling Stadium; Grambling, LA (rivalry)	L 0–1 (forfeit)		
*Non-conference game
