= 1976 UNLV Rebels football team =

American college football season

1976 UNLV Rebels football

NCAA Division II Quarterfinal, L 6–27 vs. Akron
- Conference: Independent
- Record: 9–3
- Head coach: Tony Knap (1st season)
- Home stadium: Las Vegas Stadium

1976 NCAA Division II independents football records
	Conf.			Overall
Team	W	L	T	W		L		T
No. 2 Northern Michigan ^		–		11	–	2	–	0
No. 3 Akron ^		–		10	–	3	–	0
No. 7 UNLV ^		–		9	–	3	–	0
No. 4 Delaware ^		–		8	–	3	–	1
Nevada		–		8	–	3	–	0
Portland State		–		8	–	3	–	0
Tennessee State		–		7	–	2	–	1
American International		–		6	–	3	–	0
Northern Colorado		–		6	–	3	–	0
Madison		–		7	–	4	–	0
Santa Clara		–		7	–	4	–	0
Western Carolina		–		6	–	4	–	0
Chattanooga		–		6	–	4	–	1
Southern Connecticut State		–		5	–	4	–	0
Central State (OH)		–		6	–	5	–	0
Lehigh		–		6	–	5	–	0
Arkansas–Pine Bluff		–		5	–	5	–	0
Central Connecticut		–		5	–	5	–	0
Illinois College		–		4	–	4	–	1
Lafayette		–		5	–	5	–	0
Eastern Illinois		–		5	–	6	–	0
Bucknell		–		4	–	5	–	0
Youngstown State		–		4	–	6	–	0
Kentucky State		–		3	–	7	–	1
Nebraska–Omaha		–		3	–	8	–	0
Northeastern		–		2	–	7	–	0
^ – NCAA Division II playoff participant; Rankings from Associated Press poll

The 1976 UNLV Rebels football team was an American football team that represented the University of Nevada, Las Vegas (UNLV) as an independent during the 1976 NCAA Division II football season. In their first year under head coach Tony Knap, the Rebels compiled a record if 9–3.

Hired in late January, the 61-year-old Knap was previously the head coach for Utah State from 1963 to 1966 and Boise State from 1968 to 1975.

== Schedule ==
Date	Opponent	Rank	Site	Result	Attendance	Source
September 11	Montana		Las Vegas Stadium; Whitney, NV	W 21–19	13,848	
September 18	South Dakota		Las Vegas Stadium; Whitney, NV	W 28–26	13,031	
September 25	at Weber State	No. 9	Wildcat Stadium; Ogden, UT	W 33–16	13,602	
October 2	Idaho State	No. 4	Las Vegas Stadium; Whitney, NV	W 31–17	13,702	
October 9	at Pacific (CA)	No. 2	Pacific Memorial Stadium; Stockton, CA	L 13–38	9,327	
October 16	Nebraska–Omaha	No. T–5	Las Vegas Stadium; Whitney, NV	W 63–42	13,213	
October 23	at Northern Arizona	No. T–5	Lumberjack Stadium; Flagstaff, AZ	L 28–31	6,860	
October 30	Cal Poly		Las Vegas Stadium; Whitney, NV	W 28–10	11,136–11,138	
November 6	Boise State		Las Vegas Stadium; Whitney, NV	W 31–26	14,066	
November 13	Missouri Southern	No. 9	Las Vegas Stadium; Whitney, NV	W 28–3	11,320	
November 20	Nevada	No. 7	Las Vegas Stadium; Whitney, NV (Fremont Cannon)	W 49–33	14,270	
November 37	at No. 3 Akron	No. 7	Rubber Bowl; Akron, OH (NCAA Division II Quarterfinal)	L 6–27	6,562	
Rankings from AP Poll released prior to the game
