= 1976 Tennessee State Tigers football team =

American college football season

1976 Tennessee State Tigers football
- Conference: Independent
- Record: 7–2–1
- Head coach: John Merritt (14th season)
- Home stadium: Hale Stadium

1976 NCAA Division II independents football records
	Conf.			Overall
Team	W	L	T	W		L		T
No. 2 Northern Michigan ^		–		11	–	2	–	0
No. 3 Akron ^		–		10	–	3	–	0
No. 7 UNLV ^		–		9	–	3	–	0
No. 4 Delaware ^		–		8	–	3	–	1
Nevada		–		8	–	3	–	0
Portland State		–		8	–	3	–	0
Tennessee State		–		7	–	2	–	1
American International		–		6	–	3	–	0
Northern Colorado		–		6	–	3	–	0
Madison		–		7	–	4	–	0
Santa Clara		–		7	–	4	–	0
Western Carolina		–		6	–	4	–	0
Chattanooga		–		6	–	4	–	1
Southern Connecticut State		–		5	–	4	–	0
Central State (OH)		–		6	–	5	–	0
Lehigh		–		6	–	5	–	0
Arkansas–Pine Bluff		–		5	–	5	–	0
Central Connecticut		–		5	–	5	–	0
Lafayette		–		5	–	5	–	0
Eastern Illinois		–		5	–	6	–	0
Bucknell		–		4	–	5	–	0
Youngstown State		–		4	–	6	–	0
Kentucky State		–		3	–	7	–	1
Nebraska–Omaha		–		3	–	8	–	0
Northeastern		–		2	–	7	–	0
^ – NCAA Division II playoff participant; Rankings from Associated Press poll

The 1976 Tennessee State Tigers football team represented Tennessee State University as an independent during the 1976 NCAA Division II football season. In their 14th year under head coach John Merritt, the team compiled an overall record of 7–2–1.

== Schedule ==
Date	Time	Opponent	Rank	Site	Result	Attendance	Source
September 4		vs. Middle Tennessee		Dudley Field; Nashville, TN	W 26–17	18,361	
September 11		Jackson State		Hale Stadium; Nashville, TN	W 23–20	18,106–18,601	
September 18		Alabama A&M		Hale Stadium; Nashville, TN	W 26–0	11,000	
September 25		at Texas Southern	No. 5	Jeppesen Stadium; Houston, TX	W 21–8	11,623–11,634	
October 2		at Central State (OH)	No. 3	McPherson Stadium; Wilberforce, OH	L 18–24	6,300–6,500	
October 9		at Grambling State		Grambling Stadium; Grambling, LA	W 34–20	16,221	
October 23	6:00 p.m.	at Florida A&M	No. T–10	Doak Campbell Stadium; Tallahassee, FL	W 21–3	27,500	
October 30		No. T–4 Southern	No. 7	Hale Stadium; Nashville, TN	W 21–7	7,703	
November 6		at Tennessee–Martin	No. 4	Graham Stadium; Martin, TN	L 21–26	9,500	
November 13		Chattanooga		Hale Stadium; Nashville, TN	T 14–14	12,600	
Rankings from AP Poll released prior to the game; All times are in Central time
