= 1976 Dartmouth Big Green football team =

American college football season

1976 Dartmouth Big Green football
- Conference: Ivy League
- Record: 6–3 (4–3 Ivy)
- Head coach: Jake Crouthamel (6th season)
- Captains: Patrick Sullivan; Kevin Young
- Home stadium: Memorial Field

1976 Ivy League football standings
| | Conf. | | | | | Overall |
| Team | W | | L | | T | W | | L | | T |
|---|---|---|---|---|---|---|---|---|---|---|
| Yale + | 6 | – | 1 | – | 0 | 8 | – | 1 | – | 0 |
| Brown + | 6 | – | 1 | – | 0 | 8 | – | 1 | – | 0 |
| Harvard | 4 | – | 3 | – | 0 | 6 | – | 3 | – | 0 |
| Dartmouth | 4 | – | 3 | – | 0 | 6 | – | 3 | – | 0 |
| Columbia | 2 | – | 5 | – | 0 | 3 | – | 6 | – | 0 |
| Penn | 2 | – | 5 | – | 0 | 3 | – | 6 | – | 0 |
| Princeton | 2 | – | 5 | – | 0 | 2 | – | 7 | – | 0 |
| Cornell | 2 | – | 5 | – | 0 | 2 | – | 7 | – | 0 |
+ – Conference co-champions

The 1976 Dartmouth Big Green football team was an American football team that represented Dartmouth College during the 1976 NCAA Division I football season. The Big Green tied for third place in the Ivy League.

In its sixth season under head coach Jake Crouthamel, the team compiled a 6–3 record and outscored opponents 236 to 111. Kevin Young and Patrick Sullivan were the team captains.

The Big Green's 4–3 conference record tied for third place in the Ivy League standings. Dartmouth outscored Ivy opponents 167 to 91.

Dartmouth played its home games at Memorial Field on the college campus in Hanover, New Hampshire.

== Schedule ==
| Date | Opponent | Site | Result | Attendance | Source |
|---|---|---|---|---|---|
| September 18 | Penn | Memorial Field; Hanover, NH | W 20–0 | 11,300 | |
| September 25 | New Hampshire* | Memorial Field; Hanover, NH (rivalry) | W 24–13 | 13,650 | |
| October 2 | at Holy Cross*^{†} | Fitton Field; Worcester, MA | W 45–7 | 14,416 | |
| October 9 | at Yale | Yale Bowl; New Haven, CT | L 14–18 | 10,000 | |
| October 16 | Harvard | Memorial Field; Hanover, NH (rivalry) | L 10–17 | 20,336 | |
| October 23 | at Cornell | Schoellkopf Field; Ithaca, NY (rivalry) | W 35–0 | 11,000 | |
| October 30 | Columbia | Memorial Field; Hanover, NH | W 34–14 | 10,600 | |
| November 6 | at Brown | Brown Stadium; Providence, RI | L 21–35 | 17,100 | |
| November 13 | at Princeton | Palmer Stadium; Princeton, NJ | W 33–7 | 14,500 | |
*Non-conference game; ^{†}Homecoming
