= 1976 South Carolina State Bulldogs football team =

American college football season

1976 South Carolina State Bulldogs football

Black college national champion MEAC co-champion

Bicentennial Bowl, W 26–10 vs. Norfolk State
- Conference: Mid-Eastern Athletic Conference

Ranking
- AP: No. T–8
- Record: 10–1 (5–1 MEAC)
- Head coach: Willie Jeffries (4th season)
- Defensive coordinator: James Carson (2nd season)
- Home stadium: Bulldog Stadium

1976 Mid-Eastern Athletic Conference football standings
	Conf.					Overall
Team	W		L		T	W		L		T
No. T–8 South Carolina State +	5	–	1	–	0	10	–	1	–	0
Morgan State +	5	–	1	–	0	6	–	4	–	0
North Carolina A&T	3	–	2	–	1	6	–	4	–	1
Howard	3	–	2	–	1	5	–	5	–	1
North Carolina Central	2	–	4	–	0	6	–	5	–	0
Delaware State	1	–	5	–	0	3	–	7	–	1
Maryland Eastern Shore	1	–	5	–	0	2	–	9	–	0
+ – Conference co-champions; Rankings from Associated Press poll

The 1976 South Carolina State Bulldogs football team represented South Carolina State University as a member of the Mid-Eastern Athletic Conference (MEAC) during the 1976 NCAA Division II football season. In its fourth season under head coach Willie Jeffries, the team compiled a 10–1 record (5–1 against conference opponents), tied for the MEAC championship, defeated Norfolk State in the Bicentennial Bowl, and outscored opponents by a total of 278 to 44. The team was recognized as the 1976 black college football national champion and was ranked No. 8 by the Associated Press in the final 1976 NCAA Division II football rankings.

== Schedule ==
Date	Opponent	Rank	Site	Result	Attendance	Source
September 11	at Delaware State		Alumni Stadium; Dover, DE	W 30–0	2,700	
September 18	at North Carolina A&T		World War Memorial Stadium; Greensboro, NC (rivalry)	L 14–15	20,000	
September 25	at Howard		Robert F. Kennedy Memorial Stadium; Washington, DC	W 40–0	8,500	
October 2	Alcorn State*		Bulldog Stadium; Orangeburg, SC	W 7–6	9,860–15,000	
October 9	Johnson C. Smith*		Bulldog Stadium; Orangeburg, SC	W 28–0	7,000	
October 16	at Morgan State		Hughes Stadium; Baltimore, MD	W 17–0	6,500	
October 23	Newberry*		Bulldog Stadium; Orangeburg, SC	W 25–7	5,128–5,129	
October 30	North Carolina Central		Bulldog Stadium; Orangeburg, SC	W 30–0	4,320	
November 6	Maryland Eastern Shore^{†}	No. 9	Bulldog Stadium; Orangeburg, SC	W 47–0	14,103	
November 13	at Wofford*	No. 6	Synder Field; Spartanburg, SC	W 14–6	6,200	
December 11	at Norfolk State*	No. 8	City Stadium; Richmond, VA (Bicentennial Bowl)	W 26–10	7,500	
*Non-conference game; ^{†}Homecoming; Rankings from AP Poll released prior to the game
