= 1976 Lehigh Engineers football team =

American college football season

1976 Lehigh Engineers football
- Conference: Independent
- Record: 6–5
- Head coach: John Whitehead (1st season)
- Captains: John Healy; Marc Orcutt
- Home stadium: Taylor Stadium

1976 NCAA Division II independents football records
	Conf.			Overall
Team	W	L	T	W		L		T
No. 2 Northern Michigan ^		–		11	–	2	–	0
No. 3 Akron ^		–		10	–	3	–	0
No. 7 UNLV ^		–		9	–	3	–	0
No. 4 Delaware ^		–		8	–	3	–	1
Nevada		–		8	–	3	–	0
Portland State		–		8	–	3	–	0
Tennessee State		–		7	–	2	–	1
American International		–		6	–	3	–	0
Northern Colorado		–		6	–	3	–	0
Madison		–		7	–	4	–	0
Santa Clara		–		7	–	4	–	0
Western Carolina		–		6	–	4	–	0
Chattanooga		–		6	–	4	–	1
Southern Connecticut State		–		5	–	4	–	0
Central State (OH)		–		6	–	5	–	0
Lehigh		–		6	–	5	–	0
Arkansas–Pine Bluff		–		5	–	5	–	0
Central Connecticut		–		5	–	5	–	0
Illinois College		–		4	–	4	–	1
Lafayette		–		5	–	5	–	0
Eastern Illinois		–		5	–	6	–	0
Bucknell		–		4	–	5	–	0
Youngstown State		–		4	–	6	–	0
Kentucky State		–		3	–	7	–	1
Nebraska–Omaha		–		3	–	8	–	0
Northeastern		–		2	–	7	–	0
^ – NCAA Division II playoff participant; Rankings from Associated Press poll

The 1976 Lehigh Engineers football team was an American football team that represented Lehigh University as an independent during the 1976 NCAA Division II football season.

In their first year under head coach John Whitehead, the Engineers compiled a 6–5 record. John Healy and Marc Orcutt were the team captains.

After starting the season with three wins, the Engineers briefly appeared in the national Division II coaches poll rankings, at No. 6. A loss to Division I opponent Yale dropped them to No. 9. Following a loss the next week to Division II rival Bucknell, they fell out of the top 20. Lehigh remained unranked the rest of the year.

Lehigh played its home games at Taylor Stadium on the university campus in Bethlehem, Pennsylvania.

== Schedule ==
Date	Opponent	Site	Result	Attendance	Source
September 11	Kutztown	Taylor Stadium; Bethlehem, PA	W 29–6	9,500	
September 18	Baldwin–Wallace	Taylor Stadium; Bethlehem, PA	W 21–14	8,500	
September 24	at Penn	Franklin Field; Philadelphia, PA	W 24–20	9,300–9,305	
October 2	at Yale	Yale Bowl; New Haven, CT	L 6–21	13,000–13,034	
October 9	at Bucknell	Memorial Stadium; Lewisburg, PA	L 0–3	5,000	
October 16	Rutgers	Taylor Stadium; Bethlehem, PA	L 21–28	15,000	
October 23	at Maine	Alumni Stadium; Orono, ME	W 24–0	7,600	
October 30	Gettysburg	Taylor Stadium; Bethlehem, PA	W 56–15	9,500	
November 6	at Virginia	Scott Stadium; Charlottesville, VA	L 20–21	16,743	
November 13	C.W. Post	Taylor Stadium; Bethlehem, PA	W 17–10	7,000	
November 20	at Lafayette	Fisher Field; Easton, PA (The Rivalry)	L 17–21	15,000	
