= 1976 Princeton Tigers football team =

American college football season

1976 Princeton Tigers football
- Conference: Ivy League
- Record: 2–7 (2–5 Ivy League)
- Head coach: Robert Casciola (4th season)
- Captain: Daniel E. Fournier
- Home stadium: Palmer Stadium

1976 Ivy League football standings
	Conf.					Overall
Team	W		L		T	W		L		T
Yale +	6	–	1	–	0	8	–	1	–	0
Brown +	6	–	1	–	0	8	–	1	–	0
Harvard	4	–	3	–	0	6	–	3	–	0
Dartmouth	4	–	3	–	0	6	–	3	–	0
Columbia	2	–	5	–	0	3	–	6	–	0
Penn	2	–	5	–	0	3	–	6	–	0
Princeton	2	–	5	–	0	2	–	7	–	0
Cornell	2	–	5	–	0	2	–	7	–	0
+ – Conference co-champions

The 1976 Princeton Tigers football team was an American football team that represented Princeton University during the 1976 NCAA Division I football season. Princeton tied for last place in the Ivy League.

In their fourth year under head coach Robert Casciola, the Tigers compiled a 2–7 record and were outscored 152 to 63. Daniel E. Fournier was the team captain.

Princeton's 2–5 conference record placed it in a four-way tie for fifth place, at the bottom of the Ivy League standings. The Tigers were outscored 118 to 56 by Ivy opponents.

Princeton played its home games at Palmer Stadium on the university campus in Princeton, New Jersey.

== Schedule ==
Date	Opponent	Site	Result	Attendance	Source
September 18	at Cornell	Schoellkopf Field; Ithaca, NY	W 3–0	14,000	
September 25	Rutgers*	Palmer Stadium; Princeton, NJ (rivalry)	L 0–17	29,500	
October 2	Brown	Palmer Stadium; Princeton, NJ	L 7–13	12,000	
October 9	at Columbia	Baker Field; New York, NY	W 9–3	6,745	
October 16	Colgate*	Palmer Stadium; Princeton, NJ	L 7–17	18,000	
October 23	Harvard	Palmer Stadium; Princeton, NJ (rivalry)	L 14–20	18,000	
October 30	Penn	Palmer Stadium; Princeton, NJ (rivalry)	L 9–10	10,000	
November 6	at Yale	Yale Bowl; New Haven, CT (rivalry)	L 7–39	33,218	
November 13	Dartmouth	Palmer Stadium; Princeton, NJ	L 7–33	14,500	
*Non-conference game
