= 1976 Jackson State Tigers football team =

American college football season

1976 Jackson State Tigers football
- Conference: Southwestern Athletic Conference
- Record: 5–4 (3–3 SWAC)
- Head coach: Robert Hill (5th season; first 7 games); W. C. Gorden (1st season, final 2 games)
- Home stadium: Mississippi Veterans Memorial Stadium

1976 Southwestern Athletic Conference football standings
| | Conf. | | | | | Overall |
| Team | W | | L | | T | W | | L | | T |
|---|---|---|---|---|---|---|---|---|---|---|
| No. T–8 Alcorn State $ | 5 | – | 1 | – | 0 | 8 | – | 2 | – | 0 |
| Southern | 4 | – | 2 | – | 0 | 8 | – | 3 | – | 0 |
| Grambling State | 4 | – | 2 | – | 0 | 8 | – | 4 | – | 0 |
| Prairie View A&M | 3 | – | 3 | – | 0 | 6 | – | 5 | – | 0 |
| Jackson State | 3 | – | 3 | – | 0 | 5 | – | 4 | – | 0 |
| Mississippi Valley State | 1 | – | 5 | – | 0 | 4 | – | 6 | – | 0 |
| Texas Southern | 1 | – | 5 | – | 0 | 2 | – | 9 | – | 0 |
$ – Conference champion; Rankings from Associated Press poll

The 1976 Jackson State Tigers football team represented the Jackson State University during the 1976 NCAA Division II football season as a member of the Southwestern Athletic Conference (SWAC). The Tigers were led by fifth-year head coach Robert Hill for the first seven games of the season, before he was fired and replaced by W. C. Gorden. Jackson State compiled an overall record of 5–4 with a mark of 3–3 in conference play, tying for fourth place in the SWAC.

== Schedule ==
| Date | Opponent | Site | Result | Attendance | Source |
|---|---|---|---|---|---|
| September 4 | at Alabama State* | Cramton Bowl; Montgomery, AL | W 25–7 | | |
| September 11 | at Tennessee State* | Hale Stadium; Nashville, TN | L 20–23 | 18,106–18,601 | |
| September 18 | Prairie View A&M | Mississippi Veterans Memorial Stadium; Jackson, MS | W 14–3 | 20,000 | |
| September 25 | Mississippi Valley State | Mississippi Veterans Memorial Stadium; Jackson, MS | W 13–12 | 21,000 | |
| October 9 | Nebraska–Omaha* | Mississippi Veterans Memorial Stadium; Jackson, MS | W 35–27 | 12,000 | |
| October 16 | at No. 3 Southern | University Stadium; Baton Rouge, LA (rivalry) | L 6–20 | | |
| October 23 | at Grambling State | Grambling Stadium; Grambling, LA | L 6–28 | 31,625 | |
| November 6 | Texas Southern | Mississippi Veterans Memorial Stadium; Jackson, MS | W 16–12 | 26,000 | |
| November 20 | No. T–8 Alcorn State* | Henderson Stadium; Lorman, MS (rivalry) | L 7–19 | 11,000 | |
*Non-conference game; Rankings from AP Poll released prior to the game
