= 1976 Brown Bears football team =

American college football season

1976 Brown Bears football

Ivy League co-champion
- Conference: Ivy League
- Record: 8–1 (6–1 Ivy)
- Head coach: John Anderson (4th season)
- Captains: Scott Nelson; Mike Prairie
- Home stadium: Brown Stadium

1976 Ivy League football standings
	Conf.					Overall
Team	W		L		T	W		L		T
Yale +	6	–	1	–	0	8	–	1	–	0
Brown +	6	–	1	–	0	8	–	1	–	0
Harvard	4	–	3	–	0	6	–	3	–	0
Dartmouth	4	–	3	–	0	6	–	3	–	0
Columbia	2	–	5	–	0	3	–	6	–	0
Penn	2	–	5	–	0	3	–	6	–	0
Princeton	2	–	5	–	0	2	–	7	–	0
Cornell	2	–	5	–	0	2	–	7	–	0
+ – Conference co-champions

The 1976 Brown Bears football team was an American football team that represented Brown University during the 1976 NCAA Division I football season. Brown tied for first place in the Ivy League, its first conference championship.

In their fourth season under head coach John Anderson, the Bears compiled an 8–1 record and outscored opponents 171 to 102. Scott Nelson and Mike Prairie were the team captains.

The Bears' 6–1 conference record tied for best in the Ivy League standings. They outscored Ivy opponents 140 to 84. Brown was named co-champion despite having defeated the other 6–1 team, Yale.

Brown played its home games at Brown Stadium in Providence, Rhode Island.

== Schedule ==
Date	Opponent	Site	Result	Attendance	Source
September 18	Yale	Brown Stadium; Providence, RI	W 14–6	13,500	
September 25	Rhode Island*	Brown Stadium; Providence, RI (rivalry)	W 3–0	12,500	
October 2	at Princeton	Palmer Stadium; Princeton, NJ	W 13–7	12,000	
October 9	Penn	Brown Stadium; Providence, RI	L 6–7	1,200	
October 16	at Cornell	Schoellkopf Field; Ithaca, NY	W 28–12	12,000	
October 23	Holy Cross*	Brown Stadium; Providence, RI	W 28–18	11,500	
October 30	at Harvard	Harvard Stadium; Boston, MA	W 16–14	26,500	
November 6	Dartmouth	Brown Stadium; Providence, RI	W 35–21	17,100	
November 13	at Columbia	Baker Field; New York, NY	W 28–17	6,030	
*Non-conference game
