= 1976 Harvard Crimson football team =

American college football season

1976 Harvard Crimson football
- Conference: Ivy League
- Record: 6–3 (4–3 Ivy)
- Head coach: Joe Restic (6th season)
- Captain: William D. Emper
- Home stadium: Harvard Stadium

1976 Ivy League football standings
	Conf.					Overall
Team	W		L		T	W		L		T
Yale +	6	–	1	–	0	8	–	1	–	0
Brown +	6	–	1	–	0	8	–	1	–	0
Harvard	4	–	3	–	0	6	–	3	–	0
Dartmouth	4	–	3	–	0	6	–	3	–	0
Columbia	2	–	5	–	0	3	–	6	–	0
Penn	2	–	5	–	0	3	–	6	–	0
Princeton	2	–	5	–	0	2	–	7	–	0
Cornell	2	–	5	–	0	2	–	7	–	0
+ – Conference co-champions

The 1976 Harvard Crimson football team was an American football team that represented Harvard University during the 1976 NCAA Division I football season. Harvard tied for third place in the Ivy League.

In their sixth year under head coach Joe Restic, the Crimson compiled a 6–3 record and outscored opponents 176 to 115. William D. Emper was the team captain.

Harvard's 4–3 conference record tied for third in the Ivy League standings. The Crimson outscored Ivy opponents 115 to 88.

Harvard played its home games at Harvard Stadium in the Allston neighborhood of Boston, Massachusetts.

== Schedule ==
Date	Opponent	Site	Result	Attendance	Source
September 18	Columbia	Harvard Stadium; Boston, MA	W 34–10	12,201	
September 25	UMass*	Harvard Stadium; Boston, MA	W 24–13	14,454–17,000	
October 2	Boston University*	Harvard Stadium; Boston, MA	W 37–14	14,000	
October 9	Cornell	Harvard Stadium; Boston, MA	L 3–9	8,000	
October 16	at Dartmouth	Memorial Field; Hanover, NH (rivalry)	W 17–10	20,336	
October 23	at Princeton	Palmer Stadium; Princeton, NJ (rivalry)	W 20–14	18,000	
October 30	Brown	Harvard Stadium; Boston, MA	L 14–16	26,500	
November 6	at Penn	Franklin Field; Philadelphia, PA	W 20–8	8,423	
November 13	Yale	Harvard Stadium; Boston, MA (rivalry)	L 7–21	42,000	
*Non-conference game
