= 1976 Sam Houston State Bearkats football team =

American college football season

1976 Sam Houston State Bearkats football
- Conference: Lone Star Conference
- Record: 3–5–1 (2–5 LSC)
- Head coach: Billy Tidwell (3rd season)
- Home stadium: Pritchett Field

1976 Lone Star Conference football standings
	Conf.					Overall
Team	W		L		T	W		L		T
No. 1 Texas A&I $^	7	–	0	–	0	13	–	0	–	0
No. 6 Abilene Christian	5	–	2	–	0	8	–	2	–	0
East Texas State	4	–	3	–	0	5	–	3	–	1
Southwest Texas State	4	–	3	–	0	5	–	5	–	0
Angelo State	3	–	3	–	1	5	–	5	–	1
Sam Houston State	2	–	5	–	0	3	–	5	–	1
Howard Payne	1	–	5	–	1	1	–	8	–	1
Stephen F. Austin	1	–	6	–	0	2	–	9	–	1
$ – Conference champion; ^ – NAIA Division I playoff participant; Rankings from NAIA Division I poll

The 1976 Sam Houston State Bearkats football team represented Sam Houston State University as a member of the Lone Star Conference (LSC) during the 1976 NAIA Division I football season. Led by third-year head coach Billy Tidwell, the Bearkats compiled an overall record of 3–5–1 with a mark of 2–5 in conference play, and finished sixth in the LSC.

== Schedule ==
Date	Opponent	Site	Result	Source
September 11	vs. Stephen F. Austin*	Houston Astrodome; Houston, TX (rivalry)	T 14–14	
September 18	Southwestern Oklahoma State*	Pritchett Field; Huntsville, TX	W 21–14	
September 25	East Texas State	Pritchett Field; Huntsville, TX	W 22–17	
October 9	at Angelo State	San Angelo Stadium; San Angelo, TX	L 7–24	
October 23	Southwest Texas State	Pritchett Field; Huntsville, TX	L 10–40	
October 30	at Howard Payne	Cen-Tex Stadium; Brownwood, TX	L 29–32	
November 6	at Texas A&I	Javelina Stadium; Kingsville, TX	L 10–41	
November 13	Abilene Christian	Pritchett Field; Huntsville, TX	L 0–26	
November 20	Stephen F. Austin	Pritchett Field; Huntsville, TX (rivalry)	W 8–7	
*Non-conference game
