= 1976 Columbia Lions football team =

American college football season

1976 Columbia Lions football
- Conference: Ivy League
- Record: 3–6 (2–5 Ivy)
- Head coach: Bill Campbell (3rd season)
- Captains: Ed Backus; Dave McAvoy
- Home stadium: Baker Field

1976 Ivy League football standings
	Conf.					Overall
Team	W		L		T	W		L		T
Yale +	6	–	1	–	0	8	–	1	–	0
Brown +	6	–	1	–	0	8	–	1	–	0
Harvard	4	–	3	–	0	6	–	3	–	0
Dartmouth	4	–	3	–	0	6	–	3	–	0
Columbia	2	–	5	–	0	3	–	6	–	0
Penn	2	–	5	–	0	3	–	6	–	0
Princeton	2	–	5	–	0	2	–	7	–	0
Cornell	2	–	5	–	0	2	–	7	–	0
+ – Conference co-champions

The 1976 Columbia Lions football team was an American football team that represented Columbia University during the 1976 NCAA Division I football season. Columbia tied for last place in the Ivy League.

In their third season under head coach Bill Campbell, the Lions compiled a 3–6 record and were outscored 247 to 137. Ed Backus and Dave McAvoy were the team captains.

The Lions' 2–5 conference record placed them in a four-way tie for fifth place, at the bottom of the Ivy League standings. Columbia was outscored 169 to 99 by Ivy opponents.

Columbia played its home games at Baker Field in Upper Manhattan, in New York City.

== Schedule ==
Date	Opponent	Site	Result	Attendance	Source
September 18	at Harvard	Harvard Stadium; Boston, MA	L 10–34	12,201	
September 25	Lafayette*	Baker Field; New York, NY	W 38–31	4,035	
October 2	at Penn	Franklin Field; Philadelphia, PA	W 14–10	6,688	
October 5	Princeton^{†}	Baker Field; New York, NY	L 3–9	6,745	
October 16	at Yale	Yale Bowl; New Haven, CT	L 6–37	14,035	
October 23	vs. Rutgers*	Giants Stadium; East Rutherford, NJ	L 0–47	42,328	
October 30	at Dartmouth	Memorial Field; Hanover, NH	L 14–34	10,600	
November 6	Cornell	Baker Field; New York, NY (rivalry)	W 35–17	5,120	
November 13	Brown	Baker Field; New York, NY	L 17–28	6,030	
*Non-conference game; ^{†}Homecoming
