= 1976 Delaware Fightin' Blue Hens football team =

American college football season

1976 Delaware Fightin' Blue Hens football

Lambert Cup

NCAA Division II Quarterfinal, L 17–28 vs. Northern Michigan
- Conference: Independent
- Record: 8–3–1
- Head coach: Tubby Raymond (11th season)
- Offensive coordinator: Ted Kempski (9th season)
- Offensive scheme: Delaware Wing-T
- Base defense: 5–2
- Home stadium: Delaware Stadium

1976 NCAA Division II independents football records
	Conf.			Overall
Team	W	L	T	W		L		T
No. 2 Northern Michigan ^		–		11	–	2	–	0
No. 3 Akron ^		–		10	–	3	–	0
No. 7 UNLV ^		–		9	–	3	–	0
No. 4 Delaware ^		–		8	–	3	–	1
Nevada		–		8	–	3	–	0
Portland State		–		8	–	3	–	0
Tennessee State		–		7	–	2	–	1
American International		–		6	–	3	–	0
Northern Colorado		–		6	–	3	–	0
Madison		–		7	–	4	–	0
Santa Clara		–		7	–	4	–	0
Western Carolina		–		6	–	4	–	0
Chattanooga		–		6	–	4	–	1
Southern Connecticut State		–		5	–	4	–	0
Central State (OH)		–		6	–	5	–	0
Lehigh		–		6	–	5	–	0
Arkansas–Pine Bluff		–		5	–	5	–	0
Central Connecticut		–		5	–	5	–	0
Lafayette		–		5	–	5	–	0
Eastern Illinois		–		5	–	6	–	0
Bucknell		–		4	–	5	–	0
Youngstown State		–		4	–	6	–	0
Kentucky State		–		3	–	7	–	1
Nebraska–Omaha		–		3	–	8	–	0
Northeastern		–		2	–	7	–	0
^ – NCAA Division II playoff participant; Rankings from Associated Press poll

The 1976 Delaware Fightin' Blue Hens football team represented the University of Delaware as an independent during the 1976 NCAA Division II football season. They were led by Tubby Raymond, who was in his 11th season as head coach of the Fightin' Blue Hens. The team played its home games at Delaware Stadium in Newark, Delaware. The Hens lost to Northern Michigan in the quarterfinals of the NCAA Division II playoffs and finished the season with a record of 8–3–1.

== Schedule ==
Date	Opponent	Rank	Site	Result	Attendance	Source
September 11	Eastern Kentucky		Delaware Stadium; Newark, DE	W 37–21	17,528	
September 18	at The Citadel		Johnson Hagood Stadium; Charleston, SC	L 15–17	21,570	
September 25	North Dakota		Delaware Stadium; Newark, DE	W 59–17	17,865	
October 2	at Temple		Franklin Field; Philadelphia, PA	W 18–16	15,861	
October 9	at William & Mary	No. 4	Cary Field; Williamsburg, VA (rivalry)	W 15–13	15,500	
October 16	at Villanova	No. 2	Villanova Stadium; Villanova, PA (rivalry)	T 24–24	20,528	
October 23	Virginia Military^{†}	No. 4	Delaware Stadium; Newark, DE	L 6–10	21,134	
October 30	at Connecticut	No. 8	Memorial Stadium; Storrs, CT	W 6–30	9,956	
November 6	Davidson	No. 5	Delaware Stadium; Newark, DE	W 63–0	16,130	
November 13	West Chester	No. 4	Delaware Stadium; Newark, DE (rivalry)	W 42–7	14,378	
November 20	Maine	No. 4	Delaware Stadium; Newark, DE	W 46–7	14,100–14,136	
November 27	No. 2 Northern Michigan	No. 4	Delaware Stadium; Newark, DE (NCAA Division II Quarterfinal)	L 17–38	12,500	
^{†}Homecoming; Rankings from UPI Division II Coaches Poll
