= 1976 North Carolina A&T Aggies football team =

American college football season

1976 North Carolina A&T Aggies football
- Conference: Mid-Eastern Athletic Conference
- Record: 6–4–1 (3–2–1 MEAC)
- Head coach: Hornsby Howell (9th season)
- Home stadium: World War Memorial Stadium

1976 Mid-Eastern Athletic Conference football standings
| | Conf. | | | | | Overall |
| Team | W | | L | | T | W | | L | | T |
|---|---|---|---|---|---|---|---|---|---|---|
| No. T–8 South Carolina State + | 5 | – | 1 | – | 0 | 10 | – | 1 | – | 0 |
| Morgan State + | 5 | – | 1 | – | 0 | 6 | – | 4 | – | 0 |
| North Carolina A&T | 3 | – | 2 | – | 1 | 6 | – | 4 | – | 1 |
| Howard | 3 | – | 2 | – | 1 | 5 | – | 5 | – | 1 |
| North Carolina Central | 2 | – | 4 | – | 0 | 6 | – | 5 | – | 0 |
| Delaware State | 1 | – | 5 | – | 0 | 3 | – | 7 | – | 1 |
| Maryland Eastern Shore | 1 | – | 5 | – | 0 | 2 | – | 9 | – | 0 |
+ – Conference co-champions; Rankings from Associated Press poll

The 1976 North Carolina A&T Aggies football team represented North Carolina A&T State University as a member of the Mid-Eastern Athletic Conference (MEAC) during the 1976 NCAA Division II football season. Led by ninth-year head coach Hornsby Howell, the Aggies compiled an overall record of 6–4–1, with a mark of 3–2–1 in conference play, and finished tied for third in the MEAC.

== Schedule ==
| Date | Time | Opponent | Site | Result | Attendance | Source |
|---|---|---|---|---|---|---|
| September 4 | | at Virginia Union* | City Stadium; Richmond, VA | W 26–20 | 10,000 | |
| September 18 | | South Carolina State | World War Memorial Stadium; Greensboro, NC (rivalry) | W 15–14 | 20,000 | |
| September 25 | 7:00 p.m. | at Florida A&M* | Bragg Memorial Stadium; Tallahassee, FL | L 22–24 | 12,102–14,000 | |
| October 2 | | at Johnson C. Smith* | American Legion Memorial Stadium; Charlotte, NC | W 37–22 | 20,000 | |
| October 9 | | Norfolk State* | World War Memorial Stadium; Greensboro, NC | W 13–7 | 5,000 | |
| October 16 | | Maryland Eastern Shore | World War Memorial Stadium; Greensboro, NC | W 37–13 | 9,000 | |
| October 23 | | at Howard | RFK Stadium; Washington, DC | T 21–21 | 19,853–20,000 | |
| October 30 | | Morgan State^{†} | World War Memorial Stadium; Greensboro, NC | L 16–45 | 21,500–25,000 | |
| November 6 | | vs. Grambling State* | Pontiac Silverdome; Pontiac, MI | L 18–34 | 23,606–23,607 | |
| November 13 | | Delaware State | World War Memorial Stadium; Greensboro, NC | W 30–6 | 5,000 | |
| November 20 | | at North Carolina Central | O'Kelly Stadium; Durham, NC (rivalry) | L 16–17 | 14,000 | |
*Non-conference game; ^{†}Homecoming; All times are in Eastern time
