= 1976 Yale Bulldogs football team =

American college football season

1976 Yale Bulldogs football

Ivy League co-champion
- Conference: Ivy League
- Record: 8–1 (6–1 Ivy)
- Head coach: Carmen Cozza (12th season)
- Home stadium: Yale Bowl

1976 Ivy League football standings
	Conf.					Overall
Team	W		L		T	W		L		T
Yale +	6	–	1	–	0	8	–	1	–	0
Brown +	6	–	1	–	0	8	–	1	–	0
Harvard	4	–	3	–	0	6	–	3	–	0
Dartmouth	4	–	3	–	0	6	–	3	–	0
Columbia	2	–	5	–	0	3	–	6	–	0
Penn	2	–	5	–	0	3	–	6	–	0
Princeton	2	–	5	–	0	2	–	7	–	0
Cornell	2	–	5	–	0	2	–	7	–	0
+ – Conference co-champions

The 1976 Yale Bulldogs football team represented Yale University in the 1976 NCAA Division I football season. The Bulldogs were led by 12th-year head coach Carmen Cozza, played their home games at the Yale Bowl and finished tied for first place in the Ivy League with a 6–1 record, 8–1 overall.

== Schedule ==
Date	Opponent	Site	Result	Attendance	Source
September 18	at Brown	Brown Stadium; Providence, RI	L 6–14	13,500	
September 25	Connecticut*	Yale Bowl; New Haven, CT	W 21–10	21,860	
October 2	Lehigh*	Yale Bowl; New Haven, CT	W 21–6	13,000–13,034	
October 9	Dartmouth	Yale Bowl; New Haven, CT	W 18–14	10,000	
October 16	Columbia	Yale Bowl; New Haven, CT	W 37–6	14,035	
October 23	at Penn	Franklin Field; Philadelphia, PA	W 21–7	15,101	
October 30	Cornell	Yale Bowl; New Haven, CT	W 14–6	22,519	
November 6	Princeton	Yale Bowl; New Haven, CT (rivalry)	W 39–7	33,218	
November 13	at Harvard	Harvard Stadium; Boston, MA (The Game)	W 21–7	42,000	
*Non-conference game

== Roster ==
1976 Yale Bulldogs football team roster
Players
Coaches
Offense

Pos.	#	Name	Class
OT	79	Pete McNamara	So
RB	40	John Pagliaro	Jr
QB	16	Stone Phillips	Sr
WR	85	John Spagnola	So

Defense

Pos.	#	Name	Class
LB	91	Bill Crowley	So
LB	13	Jeff Knapp	Jr
DE	92	Pete White	So

Special teams

Pos.	#	Name	Class
K	5	Randy Carter	Sr

Head coach

- Carmen Cozza

Coordinators/assistant coaches

Legend

- (C) Team captain
- (S) Suspended
- (I) Ineligible
- Injured
- Redshirt
