= 1976 Florida A&M Rattlers football team =

American college football season

1976 Florida A&M Rattlers football

Orange Blossom Classic, W 26–21 vs. Central State (OH)
- Conference: Southern Intercollegiate Athletic Conference
- Division I
- Record: 6–3–2 (3–1–1 SIAC)
- Head coach: Rudy Hubbard (3rd season)
- Defensive coordinator: Fred Goldsmith (3rd season)
- Home stadium: Bragg Memorial Stadium, Doak Campbell Stadium

1976 Southern Intercollegiate Athletic Conference football standings
	Conf.					Overall
Team	W		L		T	W		L		T
Division I
Bethune–Cookman x	4	–	1	–	0	8	–	3	–	0
Tuskegee	3	–	1	–	1	6	–	3	–	1
Florida A&M	3	–	1	–	1	6	–	3	–	2
Morris Brown	3	–	2	–	0	5	–	4	–	1
Alabama A&M	2	–	3	–	0	3	–	8	–	0
Albany State	1	–	4	–	0	5	–	5	–	0
Division II
Fort Valley State x	5	–	0	–	0	8	–	2	–	0
Knoxville	3	–	2	–	0	8	–	2	–	0
Lane	3	–	2	–	0	5	–	4	–	0
Morehouse	3	–	2	–	0	4	–	5	–	0
Clark (GA)	2	–	3	–	0	3	–	6	–	0
Miles	2	–	3	–	0	2	–	8	–	0
Fisk	1	–	4	–	0	2	–	7	–	0
Savannah State	0	–	5	–	0	0	–	9	–	0
x – Division champion/co-champions

The 1976 Florida A&M Rattlers football team represented Florida A&M University as a member of Division I of the Southern Intercollegiate Athletic Conference (SIAC) during the 1976 NCAA Division II football season. Led by third-year head coach Rudy Hubbard, the Rattlers finished the season overall record of 5–4–2 and a mark of 3–1–1 in conference play, tying for second play in the SIAC's Division I. Florida A&M defeated the Central State Marauders in the Orange Blossom Classic. Alabama State later forfeited their win over Florida A&M, improving the Rattlers' overall record to 6–3–2.

== Schedule ==
Date	Time	Opponent	Site	Result	Attendance	Source
September 18	2:00 p.m.	at Albany State	Albany, GA	W 35–22	9,500	
September 25	7:00 p.m.	North Carolina A&T*	Bragg Memorial Stadium; Tallahassee, FL	W 24–22	12,102–14,000	
October 2	7:00 p.m.	Howard*	Bragg Memorial Stadium; Tallahassee, FL	W 16–14	12,800–12,831	
October 9	2:30 p.m.	vs. Alabama State*	Ladd Stadium; Mobile, AL	W 13–16 (forfeit win)	7,893–7,991	
October 16		at Morris Brown	Herndon Stadium; Atlanta, GA	T 14–14	10,000–15,000	
October 23	7:00 p.m.	No. T–10 Tennessee State*	Doak Campbell Stadium; Tallahassee, FL	L 3–21	27,500	
October 30	7:30 p.m.	vs. Tuskegee	Tampa Stadium; Tampa, FL	T 28–28	9,000–17,000	
November 6		Alabama A&M^{†}	Bragg Memorial Stadium; Tallahassee, FL	W 53–14	15,800–15,831	
November 13		at Southern*	Southern University Stadium; Baton Rouge, LA	L 6–24	14,500–15,500	
November 20		vs. Bethune–Cookman	Tangerine Bowl; Orlando, FL (Florida Classic)	L 0–34	30,000	
December 4		vs. Central State (OH)*	Miami Orange Bowl; Miami, FL (Orange Blossom Classic)	W 26–21	18,042	
*Non-conference game; ^{†}Homecoming; Rankings from AP Poll released prior to the game; All times are in Eastern time
