= 1976 Western Kentucky Hilltoppers football team =

American college football season

1976 Western Kentucky Hilltoppers football
- Conference: Ohio Valley Conference
- Record: 4–5–1 (3–4 OVC)
- Head coach: Jimmy Feix (9th season)
- Captain: David Carter
- Home stadium: L. T. Smith Stadium

1976 Ohio Valley Conference football standings
	Conf.					Overall
Team	W		L		T	W		L		T
No. 5 Eastern Kentucky $^	6	–	1	–	0	8	–	3	–	0
Tennessee Tech	5	–	2	–	0	8	–	3	–	0
Murray State	4	–	3	–	0	5	–	6	–	0
Austin Peay	3	–	4	–	0	5	–	6	–	0
Western Kentucky	3	–	4	–	0	4	–	5	–	1
East Tennessee State	3	–	4	–	0	3	–	7	–	0
Middle Tennessee	2	–	5	–	0	4	–	7	–	0
Morehead State	2	–	5	–	0	2	–	9	–	0
$ – Conference champion; ^ – NCAA Division II playoff participant; Morehead State record adjusted for forfeit to Marshall; Rankings from Associated Press poll

The 1976 Western Kentucky football team represented Western Kentucky University during the 1976 NCAA Division II football season. Led by ninth-year head coach Jimmy Feix, the Hilltoppers compiled an overall record of 4–5–1 with a mark of 3–4 in conference play, tying for fourth place in the OVC. The team's captain was David Carter.

== Schedule ==
Date	Opponent	Rank	Site	Result	Attendance	Source
September 11	Troy State*		L. T. Smith Stadium; Bowling Green, KY	T 10–10	16,750	
September 18	at Chattanooga*		Chamberlain Field; Chattanooga, TN	W 10–7	8,000	
September 25	Austin Peay		L. T. Smith Stadium; Bowling Green, KY	W 12–7	13,300	
October 2	at East Tennessee State	No. 8	Memorial Stadium; Johnson City, TN	L 16–28	5,800	
October 16	at Tennessee Tech		Tucker Stadium; Cookeville, TN	L 12–22	15,500	
October 23	Eastern Kentucky		L. T. Smith Stadium; Bowling Green, KY (Battle of the Bluegrass)	W 10–6	18,000	
October 30	at Morehead State		Jayne Stadium; Morehead, KY	L 0–21	1,000	
November 6	Middle Tennessee^{†}		L. T. Smith Stadium; Bowling Green, KY (100 Miles of Hate)	W 38–7	20,000	
November 13	No. 5 Akron*		L. T. Smith Stadium; Bowling Green, KY	L 16–29	11,200	
November 20	at Murray State		Roy Stewart Stadium; Murray, KY (Battle for the Red Belt)	L 6–16	10,300	
*Non-conference game; ^{†}Homecoming; Rankings from AP Poll released prior to the game
