= 1976 NAIA Division I football season =

American college football season

- Regular season: August–November 1976
- Postseason: December 4–11, 1976
- National Championship: Javelina Stadium; Kingsville, TX
- Champions: Texas A&I (5)

The 1976 NAIA Division I football season was the 21st season of college football sponsored by the NAIA, was the seventh season of play of the NAIA's top division for football.

The season was played from August to November 1976 and culminated in the 1976 NAIA Division I Champion Bowl, played on December 11, 1976 at Javelina Stadium on the campus of Texas A&I University in Kingsville, Texas. Texas A&I defeated Central Arkansas in the Champion Bowl, 26–0, to win their fifth, and third consecutive, NAIA national title.

== Conference realignment ==
=== Conference changes ===
- This was the first season of play for the Central States Intercollegiate Conference. The conference, whose eight members were located in Kansas, Missouri, and Nebraska, was formed by two independent teams and six former members of the Great Plains Athletic and Nebraska College conferences.
- This was the final season of play for the Nebraska College Conference. The NCC, which had also been previously known as the Nebraska Intercollegiate Conference and Nebraska College Athletic Conference, had previously sponsored football since 1916.

=== Membership changes ===
Team	1975 conference	1976 conference
Emporia State	Great Plains	Central States
Fort Hays State	Great Plains	Central States
Kearney State	Nebraska College	Central States
Missouri Southern	Independent	Central States
Missouri Western	Independent	Central States
Northern Colorado	Great Plains (NAIA Division I)	Independent (NCAA Division II)
Nebraska–Omaha	Great Plains (NAIA Division I)	Independent (NCAA Division II)
Pittsburg State	Great Plains	Central States
Southern Colorado	Great Plains	Rocky Mountain
Washburn	Great Plains	Central States

== Conference standings ==
1976 Arkansas Intercollegiate Conference football standings
	Conf.					Overall
Team	W		L		T	W		L		T
No. 4 Central Arkansas +^	5	–	1	–	0	9	–	3	–	0
Harding +	5	–	1	–	0	7	–	5	–	0
No. 8 Henderson State	4	–	2	–	0	8	–	2	–	0
No. 16 Southern Arkansas	4	–	2	–	0	7	–	2	–	0
Ouachita Baptist	2	–	4	–	0	5	–	5	–	0
Arkansas–Monticello	1	–	5	–	0	2	–	8	–	0
Arkansas Tech	0	–	6	–	0	1	–	10	–	0
$ – Conference champion; ^ – NAIA Division I playoff participant; Rankings from NAIA Division I poll

1976 Central States Intercollegiate Conference football standings
	Conf.					Overall
Team	W		L		T	W		L		T
Fort Hays State $	5	–	1	–	0	5	–	4	–	0
No. 8 Kearney State	4	–	1	–	0	9	–	1	–	0
No. 12 Missouri Southern	4	–	1	–	0	8	–	2	–	0
Washburn	4	–	2	–	0	6	–	4	–	0
Missouri Western	1	–	4	–	0	4	–	5	–	0
Pittsburg State	1	–	4	–	0	3	–	5	–	1
Emporia State	0	–	6	–	0	0	–	10	–	0
$ – Conference champion; Rankings from NAIA Division I poll

1976 Evergreen Conference football standings
	Conf.					Overall
Team	W		L		T	W		L		T
No. 9 Oregon College $	6	–	0	–	0	9	–	1	–	0
Western Washington	4	–	2	–	0	6	–	3	–	0
Eastern Washington	3	–	2	–	1	4	–	4	–	1
Central Washington	3	–	3	–	0	3	–	6	–	0
Southern Oregon	2	–	4	–	0	3	–	6	–	0
Eastern Oregon	1	–	4	–	1	1	–	7	–	1
Oregon Tech	1	–	5	–	0	2	–	7	–	0
$ – Conference champion; Rankings from NAIA Division I poll

1976 Lone Star Conference football standings
	Conf.					Overall
Team	W		L		T	W		L		T
No. 1 Texas A&I $^	7	–	0	–	0	13	–	0	–	0
No. 6 Abilene Christian	5	–	2	–	0	8	–	2	–	0
East Texas State	4	–	3	–	0	5	–	3	–	1
Southwest Texas State	4	–	3	–	0	5	–	5	–	0
Angelo State	3	–	3	–	1	5	–	5	–	1
Sam Houston State	2	–	5	–	0	3	–	5	–	1
Howard Payne	1	–	5	–	1	1	–	8	–	1
Stephen F. Austin	1	–	6	–	0	2	–	9	–	1
$ – Conference champion; ^ – NAIA Division I playoff participant; Rankings from NAIA Division I poll

1976 Nebraska College Conference football standings
	Conf.					Overall
Team	W		L		T	W		L		T
No. 7 Kearney State $	3	–	0	–	0	9	–	1	–	0
Chadron State	1	–	2	–	0	4	–	6	–	0
Peru State	1	–	2	–	0	3	–	7	–	0
Wayne State (NE)	1	–	2	–	0	3	–	8	–	0
$ – Conference champion; Rankings from NAIA Division I poll

1976 Northern Intercollegiate Conference football standings
	Conf.					Overall
Team	W		L		T	W		L		T
No. 10 Minnesota Morris $	7	–	0	–	0	8	–	1	–	1
Michigan Tech	5	–	2	–	0	7	–	3	–	0
Minnesota Duluth	5	–	2	–	0	6	–	4	–	0
St. Cloud State	4	–	3	–	0	8	–	3	–	0
Bemidji State	3	–	4	–	0	6	–	4	–	0
Moorhead State	3	–	4	–	0	5	–	5	–	0
Winona State	1	–	6	–	0	1	–	9	–	0
Southwest State (MN)	0	–	7	–	0	0	–	9	–	0
$ – Conference champion; St. Cloud State forfeited a conference win over Minnesota Duluth and three non-conference wins; NCAA, Northern Sun Intercollegiate Conference, and St. Cloud State records do not reflect the forfeits in the team's overall record.; Rankings from NAIA Division I poll

1976 Oklahoma Intercollegiate Conference football standings
	Conf.					Overall
Team	W		L		T	W		L		T
No. 17 SE Oklahoma State $	4	–	0	–	0	8	–	3	–	0
No. 20 Northeastern State	3	–	1	–	0	6	–	3	–	1
East Central	1	–	2	–	1	6	–	3	–	2
NW Oklahoma State	1	–	2	–	1	4	–	5	–	1
SW Oklahoma State	0	–	4	–	0	4	–	7	–	0
$ – Conference champion; Rankings from NAIA Division I poll

1976 Rocky Mountain Athletic Conference football standings
	Conf.					Overall
Team	W		L		T	W		L		T
No. 3 Western State (CO) $^	9	–	0	–	0	9	–	2	–	0
No. 14 Fort Lewis	7	–	2	–	0	7	–	2	–	0
Southern Colorado	5	–	2	–	0	6	–	4	–	1
Southern Utah	4	–	5	–	0	5	–	5	–	0
Colorado Mines	3	–	4	–	0	5	–	4	–	0
Mesa	3	–	5	–	0	4	–	5	–	1
Westminster (UT)	3	–	5	–	0	4	–	5	–	0
Western New Mexico	3	–	5	–	0	3	–	7	–	0
Adams State	3	–	6	–	0	3	–	6	–	0
New Mexico Highlands	1	–	7	–	0	1	–	8	–	0
$ – Conference champion; ^ – NAIA Division I playoff participant; Rankings from NAIA Division I poll

1976 South Atlantic Conference football standings
	Conf.					Overall
Team	W		L		T	W		L		T
No. 2 Elon $^	7	–	0	–	0	11	–	1	–	0
Catawba	5	–	2	–	0	8	–	3	–	0
Newberry	4	–	3	–	0	5	–	5	–	0
Mars Hill	3	–	3	–	1	4	–	4	–	1
Gardner–Webb	3	–	4	–	0	5	–	5	–	0
Carson–Newman	3	–	4	–	0	3	–	7	–	0
Presbyterian	2	–	5	–	0	3	–	7	–	0
Lenoir Rhyne	0	–	6	–	1	0	–	10	–	1
$ – Conference champion; ^ – NAIA Division I playoff participant; Rankings from NAIA Division I poll

1976 West Virginia Intercollegiate Athletic Conference football standings
	Conf.					Overall
Team	W		L		T	W		L		T
Northern Division
No. 5 Shepherd xy	4	–	0	–	0	10	–	2	–	0
No. 11 Salem	3	–	1	–	0	8	–	1	–	1
West Liberty State	2	–	2	–	0	5	–	5	–	0
Fairmont State	1	–	3	–	0	4	–	6	–	0
West Virginia Wesleyan	0	–	4	–	0	2	–	8	–	0
Southern Division
No. T–19 Concord xy$	4	–	0	–	0	8	–	3	–	0
West Virginia State	2	–	2	–	0	4	–	4	–	1
Bluefield State	2	–	2	–	0	4	–	6	–	0
West Virginia Tech	1	–	3	–	0	2	–	7	–	0
Glenville State	1	–	3	–	0	3	–	7	–	0
Championship: Concord 21, Shepherd 7
$ – Conference champion; Conference standings based on power ratings; Rankings from NAIA Division I poll for Salem and Shepherd and NAIA Division II poll for Concord

1976 Wisconsin State University Conference football standings
	Conf.					Overall
Team	W		L		T	W		L		T
No. 15 Wisconsin–Oshkosh +	6	–	2	–	0	8	–	2	–	0
No. 13 Wisconsin–Platteville +	6	–	2	–	0	8	–	2	–	0
Wisconsin–River Falls +	6	–	2	–	0	7	–	3	–	0
Wisconsin–La Crosse	5	–	3	–	0	7	–	3	–	0
Wisconsin–Stevens Point	5	–	3	–	0	7	–	3	–	0
Wisconsin–Eau Claire	4	–	4	–	0	5	–	5	–	0
Wisconsin–Stout	2	–	6	–	0	3	–	6	–	0
Wisconsin–Whitewater	2	–	6	–	0	2	–	9	–	0
Wisconsin–Superior	0	–	8	–	0	0	–	10	–	0
+ – Conference co-champions; Rankings from NAIA Division I poll

1976 NAIA Division I independents football records
	Conf.			Overall
Team	W	L	T	W		L		T
No. 18 Eastern New Mexico		–		7	–	3	–	1
Liberty Baptist		–		5	–	4	–	1
Langston		–		4	–	4	–	1
Guilford		–		4	–	6	–	0
Cameron		–		4	–	7	–	0
Wofford		–		4	–	7	–	0
Kentucky State		–		3	–	7	–	1
Rankings from NAIA Division I poll

== Postseason ==
Semifinals; December 4, 1976
Central Arkansas	10
Elon*	7
Western State (CO)	14
Texas A&I*	56

1976 NAIA Champion Bowl; December 11, 1976; Kingsville, TX
Central Arkansas	0
Texas A&I*	26

== See also ==
- 1976 NAIA Division II football season
- 1976 NCAA Division I football season
- 1976 NCAA Division II football season
- 1976 NCAA Division III football season
