= 1976 Alcorn State Braves football team =

American college football season

1976 Alcorn State Braves football

SWAC champion
- Conference: Southwestern Athletic Conference

Ranking
- AP: No. T–8
- Record: 8–2 (5–1 SWAC)
- Head coach: Marino Casem (13th season)
- Home stadium: Henderson Stadium

1976 Southwestern Athletic Conference football standings
	Conf.					Overall
Team	W		L		T	W		L		T
No. T–8 Alcorn State $	5	–	1	–	0	8	–	2	–	0
Southern	4	–	2	–	0	8	–	3	–	0
Grambling State	4	–	2	–	0	8	–	4	–	0
Prairie View A&M	3	–	3	–	0	6	–	5	–	0
Jackson State	3	–	3	–	0	5	–	4	–	0
Mississippi Valley State	1	–	5	–	0	4	–	6	–	0
Texas Southern	1	–	5	–	0	2	–	9	–	0
$ – Conference champion; Rankings from Associated Press poll

The 1976 Alcorn State Braves football team represented Alcorn State University as a member of the Southwestern Athletic Conference (SWAC) during the 1976 NCAA Division II football season. Led by 13th-year head coach Marino Casem, the Braves compiled an overall record of 8–2, with a conference record of 5–1, and finished as SWAC champion.

== Schedule ==
Date	Opponent	Rank	Site	Result	Attendance	Source
September 11	vs. Grambling State		State Fair Stadium; Shreveport, LA	W 24–0	12,000–22,000	
September 18	at Angelo State*		San Angelo Stadium; San Angelo, TX	W 22–14	12,000	
September 25	North Carolina Central*	No. 2	Henderson Stadium; Lorman, MS	W 23–17	8,000	
October 2	at South Carolina State*	No. 2	Bulldog Stadium; Orangeburg, SC	L 6–7	9,860–15,000	
October 9	Texas Southern	No. T–7	Henderson Stadium; Lorman, MS	W 47–6	6,000	
October 23	Southern	No. 3	Henderson Stadium; Lorman, MS	W 3–0	12,000	
October 30	Bishop*^{†}	No. 2	Henderson Stadium; Lorman, MS	W 38–7	9,000	
November 6	at Mississippi Valley State	No. 2	Magnolia Stadium; Itta Bena, MS	W 42–7	7,000–9,000	
November 13	at Prairie View A&M	No. 2	Blackshear Field; Prairie View, TX	L 6–14	4,000	
November 20	Jackson State	No. T–8	Henderson Stadium; Lorman, MS (rivalry)	W 19–7	11,000	
*Non-conference game; ^{†}Homecoming; Rankings from AP Poll released prior to the game
