= 1976 Eastern Illinois Panthers football team =

American college football season

1976 Eastern Illinois Panthers football
- Conference: Independent
- Record: 5–6
- Head coach: John Konstantinos (2nd season)
- Home stadium: O'Brien Stadium

1976 NCAA Division II independents football records
	Conf.			Overall
Team	W	L	T	W		L		T
No. 2 Northern Michigan ^		–		11	–	2	–	0
No. 3 Akron ^		–		10	–	3	–	0
No. 7 UNLV ^		–		9	–	3	–	0
No. 4 Delaware ^		–		8	–	3	–	1
Nevada		–		8	–	3	–	0
Portland State		–		8	–	3	–	0
Tennessee State		–		7	–	2	–	1
American International		–		6	–	3	–	0
Northern Colorado		–		6	–	3	–	0
Madison		–		7	–	4	–	0
Santa Clara		–		7	–	4	–	0
Western Carolina		–		6	–	4	–	0
Chattanooga		–		6	–	4	–	1
Southern Connecticut State		–		5	–	4	–	0
Central State (OH)		–		6	–	5	–	0
Lehigh		–		6	–	5	–	0
Arkansas–Pine Bluff		–		5	–	5	–	0
Central Connecticut		–		5	–	5	–	0
Lafayette		–		5	–	5	–	0
Eastern Illinois		–		5	–	6	–	0
Bucknell		–		4	–	5	–	0
Youngstown State		–		4	–	6	–	0
Kentucky State		–		3	–	7	–	1
Nebraska–Omaha		–		3	–	8	–	0
Northeastern		–		2	–	7	–	0
^ – NCAA Division II playoff participant; Rankings from Associated Press poll

The 1976 Eastern Illinois Panthers football team represented Eastern Illinois University as an independent during the 1976 NCAA Division II football season. The Panthers played their home games at O'Brien Stadium in Charleston, Illinois.

== Schedule ==
Date	Opponent	Site	Result	Attendance	Source
September 4	Cameron	O'Brien Stadium; Charleston, IL	W 17–16	4,000	
September 11	at Northeast Missouri State	Stokes Stadium; Kirksville, MO	W 24–14	5,000	
September 25	at Southwest Missouri State	Briggs Stadium; Springfield, MO	W 41–0	4,000	
October 2	Central Missouri	O'Brien Stadium; Charleston, IL	W 41–14	8,500	
October 9	Tennessee Tech	O'Brien Stadium; Charleston, IL	L 14–41	6,500	
October 16	at No. T–9 Western Illinois	Hanson Field; Macomb, IL	L 10–14	16,808	
October 23	Central State (OH)	O'Brien Stadium; Charleston, IL	W 24–8	1,000	
October 30	No. 1 Northern Michigan	O'Brien Stadium; Charleston, IL	L 10–30	6,500	
November 6	at Youngstown State	Rayen Stadium; Youngstown, OH	L 14–36	3,000	
November 13	at Butler	Butler Bowl; Indianapolis, IN	L 27–28	2,000	
November 20	Illinois State	O'Brien Stadium; Charleston, IL (rivalry)	L 8–13	4,500	
Rankings from Associated Press Poll released prior to the game
