= 1976 Akron Zips football team =

American college football season

1976 Akron Zips football

Pioneer Bowl, L 13–24 vs. Montana State
- Conference: Independent

Ranking
- AP: No. 3
- Record: 10–3
- Head coach: Jim Dennison (4th season)
- Defensive coordinator: Wally Neal
- Home stadium: Rubber Bowl

1976 NCAA Division II independents football records
	Conf.			Overall
Team	W	L	T	W		L		T
No. 2 Northern Michigan ^		–		11	–	2	–	0
No. 3 Akron ^		–		10	–	3	–	0
No. 7 UNLV ^		–		9	–	3	–	0
No. 4 Delaware ^		–		8	–	3	–	1
Nevada		–		8	–	3	–	0
Portland State		–		8	–	3	–	0
Tennessee State		–		7	–	2	–	1
American International		–		6	–	3	–	0
Northern Colorado		–		6	–	3	–	0
Madison		–		7	–	4	–	0
Santa Clara		–		7	–	4	–	0
Western Carolina		–		6	–	4	–	0
Chattanooga		–		6	–	4	–	1
Southern Connecticut State		–		5	–	4	–	0
Central State (OH)		–		6	–	5	–	0
Lehigh		–		6	–	5	–	0
Arkansas–Pine Bluff		–		5	–	5	–	0
Central Connecticut		–		5	–	5	–	0
Lafayette		–		5	–	5	–	0
Eastern Illinois		–		5	–	6	–	0
Bucknell		–		4	–	5	–	0
Youngstown State		–		4	–	6	–	0
Kentucky State		–		3	–	7	–	1
Nebraska–Omaha		–		3	–	8	–	0
Northeastern		–		2	–	7	–	0
^ – NCAA Division II playoff participant; Rankings from Associated Press poll

The 1976 Akron Zips football team was an American football team that represented the University of Akron during the 1976 NCAA Division II football season. In their fourth season under head coach Jim Dennison, the Zips compiled a 10–3 record and outscored all opponents by a combined total of 282 to 144. In post-season play, they defeated UNLV, 27–6, in a Division II quarterfinal, and defeated Northern Michigan, 29–26, in the Knute Rockne Bowl. In the championship game in Wichita Falls, Texas, Akron lost to Montana State in the Pioneer Bowl. The 1976 season was the first and only ten-win season in Akron's program history.

== Schedule ==
Date	Opponent	Rank	Site	Result	Attendance	Source
September 11	Temple		Rubber Bowl; Akron, OH	L 13–23	33,158	
September 18	Morehead State		Rubber Bowl; Akron, OH	W 26–6	10,102	
September 25	at Youngstown State		Stambaugh Stadium; Youngstown, OH (Steel Tire)	W 24–3	4,846	
October 2	at Indiana State		Memorial Stadium; Terre Haute, IN	W 34–7	8,318	
October 9	Dayton		Rubber Bowl; Akron, OH	W 27–6	7,439	
October 16	at Ball State	No. T–5	Ball State Stadium; Muncie, IN	W 3–0	18,323	
October 23	Eastern Michigan	No. T–5	Rubber Bowl; Akron, OH	W 36–0	9,042	
October 30	at Marshall	No. 3	Fairfield Stadium; Huntington, WV	L 0–13	7,191	
November 6	at No. 7 Western Illinois	No. T–8	Hanson Field; Macomb, IL	W 21–14	13,743	
November 13	at Western Kentucky	No. 5	L. T. Smith Stadium; Bowling Green, KY	W 29–16	11,200	
November 27	No. 7 UNLV	No. 3	Rubber Bowl; Akron, OH (NCAA Division II Quarterfinal)	W 27–6	6,562	
December 4	No. 2 Northern Michigan	No. 3	Rubber Bowl; Akron, OH (Knute Rockne Bowl—NCAA Division II Semifinal)	W 29–26		
December 11	vs. No. 1 Montana State	No. 3	Lake Wichita Park; Wichita Falls, TX (Pioneer Bowl—NCAA Division II Championship Game)	L 13–24	13,200	
Rankings from Associated Press Poll released prior to the game
