= 1976 NCAA Division II football season =

American college football season

- Regular season: August – November 1976
- Playoffs: November 27 – December 11, 1976
- National Championship: Pioneer Bowl; Memorial Stadium; Wichita Falls, TX
- Champion: Montana State

The 1976 NCAA Division II football season, part of college football in the United States organized by the National Collegiate Athletic Association at the Division II level, began in August 1976 and concluded with the championship game on December 11 at Memorial Stadium in Wichita Falls, Texas. The Montana State Bobcats defeated the Akron Zips 24–13 in the Pioneer Bowl to win their only Division II national title.

== Conference changes and new programs ==
School	1975 Conference	1976 Conference
Alabama State	SIAC	D-II Independent
Cal State Los Angeles	CCAA	Independent
Eastern Michigan	Independent	MAC (D-I)
Illinois State	D-II Independent	D-I Independent

== Conference standings ==
1976 Big Sky Conference football standings
	Conf.					Overall
Team	W		L		T	W		L		T
No. 1 Montana State $^	6	–	0	–	0	12	–	1	–	0
Idaho	5	–	1	–	0	7	–	4	–	0
Northern Arizona	4	–	2	–	0	8	–	3	–	0
Montana	3	–	3	–	0	4	–	6	–	0
Boise State	2	–	4	–	0	5	–	5	–	1
Weber State	1	–	5	–	0	2	–	9	–	0
Idaho State	0	–	6	–	0	1	–	9	–	0
$ – Conference champion; ^ – NCAA Division II playoff participant; Rankings from NCAA Division II AP Poll

1976 California Collegiate Athletic Association football standings
	Conf.					Overall
Team	W		L		T	W		L		T
Cal Poly $	2	–	0	–	0	7	–	1	–	1
Cal Poly Pomona	1	–	1	–	0	4	–	5	–	1
Cal State Northridge	1	–	2	–	0	8	–	3	–	0
Cal State Los Angeles	0	–	1	–	0	5	–	3	–	1
$ – Conference champion

1976 Central Intercollegiate Athletic Association football standings
	Conf.					Overall
Team	W		L		T	W		L		T
Norfolk State $	7	–	1	–	0	8	–	3	–	0
Hampton	6	–	2	–	0	7	–	4	–	0
Fayetteville State	5	–	3	–	0	7	–	3	–	0
Virginia Union	5	–	3	–	0	7	–	4	–	0
Livingstone	4	–	4	–	0	6	–	5	–	0
Winston-Salem State	4	–	4	–	0	4	–	6	–	0
Johnson C. Smith	3	–	5	–	0	4	–	7	–	0
Virginia State	3	–	5	–	0	4	–	7	–	0
Elizabeth City State	3	–	5	–	0	3	–	7	–	0
Saint Paul's (VA)	1	–	7	–	0	3	–	8	–	0
Shaw	1	–	7	–	0	2	–	7	–	0
$ – Conference champion

1976 Far Western Conference football standings
	Conf.					Overall
Team	W		L		T	W		L		T
UC Davis $	5	–	0	–	0	8	–	2	–	0
Humboldt State	4	–	1	–	0	5	–	5	–	0
Chico State	2	–	3	–	0	5	–	6	–	0
San Francisco State	2	–	3	–	0	4	–	7	–	0
Sacramento State	2	–	3	–	0	2	–	8	–	0
Cal State Hayward	0	–	5	–	0	1	–	8	–	1
$ – Conference champion

1976 Great Lakes Intercollegiate Athletic Conference football standings
	Conf.					Overall
Team	W		L		T	W		L		T
No. 15 Northwood $	4	–	1	–	0	5	–	2	–	1
No. 7 Grand Valley State	3	–	2	–	0	8	–	2	–	0
Wayne State (MI)	3	–	2	–	0	6	–	2	–	0
Ferris State	3	–	2	–	0	5	–	5	–	0
Hillsdale	2	–	3	–	0	5	–	5	–	0
Saginaw Valley State	0	–	5	–	0	3	–	7	–	0
$ – Conference champion; Rankings from NAIA Division II poll

1976 Gulf South Conference football standings
	Conf.					Overall
Team	W		L		T	W		L		T
No. 6 Troy State $	7	–	1	–	0	8	–	1	–	1
Southeastern Louisiana	6	–	1	–	1	9	–	1	–	1
Jacksonville State	6	–	2	–	0	6	–	4	–	0
Tennessee–Martin	5	–	3	–	0	8	–	3	–	0
Livingston	5	–	3	–	0	5	–	5	–	0
North Alabama	3	–	4	–	1	4	–	5	–	1
Delta State	2	–	5	–	1	4	–	6	–	1
Nicholls State	2	–	5	–	1	4	–	6	–	1
Mississippi College	0	–	8	–	0	2	–	8	–	0
$ – Conference champion; Troy State's and Livingston's games against Alabama State, Jacksonville State's game against Alabama A&M, Tennessee–Martin's games against Austin Peay and Murray State, and Mississippi College's game against Ouachita Baptist were designated as conference games and counted in the Gulf South standings.; Rankings from AP Poll

1976 Indiana Collegiate Conference football standings
	Conf.					Overall
Team	W		L		T	W		L		T
Saint Joseph's (IN) +	4	–	1	–	0	6	–	3	–	0
Evansville +	4	–	1	–	0	4	–	6	–	0
Indiana Central	3	–	2	–	0	6	–	4	–	0
Butler	2	–	3	–	0	6	–	4	–	0
Valparaiso	2	–	3	–	0	2	–	7	–	1
DePauw	0	–	5	–	0	2	–	8	–	0
+ – Conference co-champions

1976 Mid-Eastern Athletic Conference football standings
	Conf.					Overall
Team	W		L		T	W		L		T
No. T–8 South Carolina State +	5	–	1	–	0	10	–	1	–	0
Morgan State +	5	–	1	–	0	6	–	4	–	0
North Carolina A&T	3	–	2	–	1	6	–	4	–	1
Howard	3	–	2	–	1	5	–	5	–	1
North Carolina Central	2	–	4	–	0	6	–	5	–	0
Delaware State	1	–	5	–	0	3	–	7	–	1
Maryland Eastern Shore	1	–	5	–	0	2	–	9	–	0
+ – Conference co-champions; Rankings from Associated Press poll

1976 Missouri Intercollegiate Athletic Association football standings
	Conf.					Overall
Team	W		L		T	W		L		T
SE Missouri State +	4	–	1	–	1	7	–	3	–	1
NE Missouri State +	4	–	1	–	1	5	–	3	–	1
NW Missouri State	4	–	2	–	0	8	–	2	–	0
SW Missouri State	4	–	2	–	0	5	–	6	–	0
Missouri–Rolla	2	–	4	–	0	4	–	6	–	1
Central Missouri State	2	–	4	–	0	3	–	8	–	0
Lincoln (MO)	0	–	6	–	0	0	–	11	–	0
+ – Conference co-champions

1976 North Central Conference football standings
	Conf.					Overall
Team	W		L		T	W		L		T
No. T–8 North Dakota State $^	6	–	0	–	0	9	–	3	–	0
South Dakota State	4	–	1	–	1	5	–	4	–	1
Northern Iowa	4	–	2	–	0	8	–	3	–	0
South Dakota	3	–	2	–	1	4	–	5	–	1
North Dakota	1	–	4	–	1	1	–	7	–	1
Augustana (SD)	1	–	5	–	0	4	–	6	–	0
Morningside	0	–	5	–	1	1	–	7	–	1
$ – Conference champion; ^ – NCAA Division II playoff participant; Rankings from AP Poll

1976 Northern Intercollegiate Conference football standings
	Conf.					Overall
Team	W		L		T	W		L		T
No. 10 Minnesota Morris $	7	–	0	–	0	8	–	1	–	1
Michigan Tech	5	–	2	–	0	7	–	3	–	0
Minnesota Duluth	5	–	2	–	0	6	–	4	–	0
St. Cloud State	4	–	3	–	0	8	–	3	–	0
Bemidji State	3	–	4	–	0	6	–	4	–	0
Moorhead State	3	–	4	–	0	5	–	5	–	0
Winona State	1	–	6	–	0	1	–	9	–	0
Southwest State (MN)	0	–	7	–	0	0	–	9	–	0
$ – Conference champion; St. Cloud State forfeited a conference win over Minnesota Duluth and three non-conference wins; NCAA, Northern Sun Intercollegiate Conference, and St. Cloud State records do not reflect the forfeits in the team's overall record.; Rankings from NAIA Division I poll

1976 Ohio Valley Conference football standings
	Conf.					Overall
Team	W		L		T	W		L		T
No. 5 Eastern Kentucky $^	6	–	1	–	0	8	–	3	–	0
Tennessee Tech	5	–	2	–	0	8	–	3	–	0
Murray State	4	–	3	–	0	5	–	6	–	0
Austin Peay	3	–	4	–	0	5	–	6	–	0
Western Kentucky	3	–	4	–	0	4	–	5	–	1
East Tennessee State	3	–	4	–	0	3	–	7	–	0
Middle Tennessee	2	–	5	–	0	4	–	7	–	0
Morehead State	2	–	5	–	0	2	–	9	–	0
$ – Conference champion; ^ – NCAA Division II playoff participant; Morehead State record adjusted for forfeit to Marshall; Rankings from Associated Press poll

1976 Pennsylvania State Athletic Conference football standings
	Conf.					Overall
Team	W		L		T	W		L		T
East Division
East Stroudsburg xy+	6	–	0	–	0	9	–	0	–	1
West Chester	4	–	1	–	0	5	–	4	–	0
Millersville	4	–	2	–	0	6	–	3	–	0
Kutztown	3	–	3	–	0	5	–	5	–	0
Bloomsburg	2	–	4	–	0	2	–	7	–	0
Cheyney	1	–	5	–	0	1	–	7	–	0
Mansfield	0	–	5	–	0	2	–	7	–	1
West Division
Shippensburg xy+	5	–	1	–	0	8	–	2	–	1
Slippery Rock x	5	–	1	–	0	7	–	3	–	0
Edinboro	4	–	2	–	0	6	–	4	–	0
Clarion	3	–	3	–	0	7	–	3	–	0
Indiana (PA)	3	–	3	–	0	4	–	5	–	0
California (PA)	1	–	5	–	0	2	–	7	–	0
Lock Haven	0	–	6	–	0	2	–	8	–	0
Championship: East Stroudsburg 14, Shippensburg 14
+ – Conference co-champions; x – Division champion/co-champions; y – Championship game participant

1976 Southwestern Athletic Conference football standings
	Conf.					Overall
Team	W		L		T	W		L		T
No. T–8 Alcorn State $	5	–	1	–	0	8	–	2	–	0
Southern	4	–	2	–	0	8	–	3	–	0
Grambling State	4	–	2	–	0	8	–	4	–	0
Prairie View A&M	3	–	3	–	0	6	–	5	–	0
Jackson State	3	–	3	–	0	5	–	4	–	0
Mississippi Valley State	1	–	5	–	0	4	–	6	–	0
Texas Southern	1	–	5	–	0	2	–	9	–	0
$ – Conference champion; Rankings from Associated Press poll

1976 Southern Intercollegiate Athletic Conference football standings
	Conf.					Overall
Team	W		L		T	W		L		T
Division I
Bethune–Cookman x	4	–	1	–	0	8	–	3	–	0
Tuskegee	3	–	1	–	1	6	–	3	–	1
Florida A&M	3	–	1	–	1	6	–	3	–	2
Morris Brown	3	–	2	–	0	5	–	4	–	1
Alabama A&M	2	–	3	–	0	3	–	8	–	0
Albany State	1	–	4	–	0	5	–	5	–	0
Division II
Fort Valley State x	5	–	0	–	0	8	–	2	–	0
Knoxville	3	–	2	–	0	8	–	2	–	0
Lane	3	–	2	–	0	5	–	4	–	0
Morehouse	3	–	2	–	0	4	–	5	–	0
Clark (GA)	2	–	3	–	0	3	–	6	–	0
Miles	2	–	3	–	0	2	–	8	–	0
Fisk	1	–	4	–	0	2	–	7	–	0
Savannah State	0	–	5	–	0	0	–	9	–	0
x – Division champion/co-champions

1976 West Virginia Intercollegiate Athletic Conference football standings
	Conf.					Overall
Team	W		L		T	W		L		T
Northern Division
No. 5 Shepherd xy	4	–	0	–	0	10	–	2	–	0
No. 11 Salem	3	–	1	–	0	8	–	1	–	1
West Liberty State	2	–	2	–	0	5	–	5	–	0
Fairmont State	1	–	3	–	0	4	–	6	–	0
West Virginia Wesleyan	0	–	4	–	0	2	–	8	–	0
Southern Division
No. T–19 Concord xy$	4	–	0	–	0	8	–	3	–	0
West Virginia State	2	–	2	–	0	4	–	4	–	1
Bluefield State	2	–	2	–	0	4	–	6	–	0
West Virginia Tech	1	–	3	–	0	2	–	7	–	0
Glenville State	1	–	3	–	0	3	–	7	–	0
Championship: Concord 21, Shepherd 7
$ – Conference champion; Conference standings based on power ratings; Rankings from NAIA Division I poll for Salem and Shepherd and NAIA Division II poll for Concord

1976 Yankee Conference football standings
	Conf.					Overall
Team	W		L		T	W		L		T
No. T–8 New Hampshire $^	4	–	1	–	0	8	–	3	–	0
UMass	3	–	2	–	0	5	–	5	–	0
Maine	2	–	3	–	0	6	–	5	–	0
Rhode Island	2	–	3	–	0	3	–	5	–	0
Boston University	2	–	3	–	0	3	–	7	–	0
Connecticut	2	–	3	–	0	2	–	9	–	0
$ – Conference champion; ^ – NCAA Division II playoff participant; Rankings from Associated Press poll

1976 NCAA Division II independents football records
	Conf.			Overall
Team	W	L	T	W		L		T
No. 2 Northern Michigan ^		–		11	–	2	–	0
No. 3 Akron ^		–		10	–	3	–	0
No. 7 UNLV ^		–		9	–	3	–	0
No. 4 Delaware ^		–		8	–	3	–	1
Nevada		–		8	–	3	–	0
Portland State		–		8	–	3	–	0
Tennessee State		–		7	–	2	–	1
American International		–		6	–	3	–	0
Northern Colorado		–		6	–	3	–	0
Madison		–		7	–	4	–	0
Santa Clara		–		7	–	4	–	0
Western Carolina		–		6	–	4	–	0
Chattanooga		–		6	–	4	–	1
Southern Connecticut State		–		5	–	4	–	0
Central State (OH)		–		6	–	5	–	0
Lehigh		–		6	–	5	–	0
Arkansas–Pine Bluff		–		5	–	5	–	0
Central Connecticut		–		5	–	5	–	0
Lafayette		–		5	–	5	–	0
Eastern Illinois		–		5	–	6	–	0
Bucknell		–		4	–	5	–	0
Youngstown State		–		4	–	6	–	0
Kentucky State		–		3	–	7	–	1
Nebraska–Omaha		–		3	–	8	–	0
Northeastern		–		2	–	7	–	0
^ – NCAA Division II playoff participant; Rankings from Associated Press poll

== Conference summaries ==
Conference Champions

Big Sky Conference – Montana State
Central Intercollegiate Athletic Association – Norfolk State
Far Western Football Conference – UC Davis
Great Lakes Intercollegiate Athletic Conference – Northwood
Gulf South Conference – Troy State
Indiana Collegiate Conference - Evansville and St. Joseph's
Lone Star Conference – Texas A&I
Missouri Intercollegiate Athletic Association – Northeast Missouri State and Southeast Missouri State
North Central Conference – North Dakota State
Northern Intercollegiate Conference – Minnesota–Morris
Pennsylvania State Athletic Conference – East Stroudsburg
Rocky Mountain Athletic Conference – Western State (CO)
South Atlantic Conference – Elon
Southern Intercollegiate Athletic Conference (Division II) – Bethune-Cookman
Yankee Conference – New Hampshire

== Postseason ==
1976 NCAA Division II Football Championship
- Teams: 8
- Finals Site: Memorial Stadium; Wichita Falls, TX
- Champion: Montana State; (1st title, 1st title game)
- Runner-up: Akron; (1st title game)
- Semifinalists: Northern Michigan; North Dakota State
- Winning coach: Sonny Holland; 1st championship
- Attendance: 13,200 (Pioneer Bowl)

The 1976 NCAA Division II Football Championship playoffs were the fourth single-elimination tournament to determine the national champion of men's Division II college football. The championship game (Pioneer Bowl) was held at Memorial Stadium in Wichita Falls, Texas for the first time.

=== Playoff bracket ===
First round Campus sites November 27
Akron*	27
UNLV	6
Northern Michigan	28
Delaware*	17
North Dakota State	10
Eastern Kentucky*	7
Montana State*	17
New Hampshire	16

Semifinals; Campus sites Knute Rockne Bowl; Grantland Rice Bowl; December 4
Akron*	29
Northern Michigan	26
North Dakota State*	3
Montana State	10

Championship; Pioneer Bowl; Memorial Stadium; Wichita Falls, TX; December 11
Akron	13
Montana State	24

* Denotes host institution

== See also ==
- 1976 NCAA Division I football season
- 1976 NCAA Division III football season
- 1976 NAIA Division I football season
- 1976 NAIA Division II football season
