= 1976 NCAA Division II football rankings =

The 1976 NCAA Division II football rankings are from the Associated Press and Jet. This is for the 1976 NCAA Division II football season.

== Legend ==
| | Increase in ranking |
| | Decrease in ranking |
| | Not ranked previous week |
| (#–#) | Win–loss record |
| (Italics) | Number of first place votes |
| т | Tied with team above or below also with this symbol |

== Associated Press poll ==
| | Week 1 Sept 22 | Week 2 Sept 29 | Week 3 Oct 6 | Week 4 Oct 13 | Week 5 Oct 20 | Week 6 Oct 27 | Week 7 Nov 3 | Week 8 Nov 10 | Week 9 Nov 17 | |
|---|---|---|---|---|---|---|---|---|---|---|
| 1. | Northern Michigan (3–0) | Northern Michigan (4–0) | Northern Michigan (5–0) | Northern Michigan (6–0) | Northern Michigan (7–0) | Northern Michigan (8–0) | Northern Michigan (9–0) | Northern Michigan (10–0) | Montana State (9–1) | 1. |
| 2. | Alcorn State (2–0) | Alcorn State (3–0) | UNLV (4–0) | Delaware (4–1) | Southern (6–0) | Alcorn State (5–1) | Alcorn State (6–1) | Alcorn State (7–1) | Northern Michigan (10–1) | 2. |
| 3. | Montana State (2–0) | Tennessee State (4–0) | Western Illinois (4–0) | Southern (5–0) | Alcorn State (4–1) | Akron (6–1) | Montana State (7–1) | Montana State (8–1) | Akron (8–2) | 3. |
| 4. | New Hampshire (2–0) | UNLV (3–0) | Delaware (3–1) | Alcorn State (4–1) | Delaware (4–1–1) | Montana State (6–1) т | Tennessee State (7–1) | Delaware (6–2–1) | Delaware (7–2–1) | 4. |
| 5. | Tennessee State (2–0) | Western Illinois (3–0) | Troy State (4–0–1) | Akron (4–1) т | Akron (5–1) т | Southern (6–1) т | Delaware (5–2–1) | Akron (7–2) | Eastern Kentucky (7–2) | 5. |
| 6. | Western Carolina (3–0) | Lehigh (3–0) | Southern (4–0) | UNLV (4–1) т | UNLV (5–1) т | Tennessee Tech (6–1) | Northern Arizona (6–1) | South Carolina State (8–1) | Troy State (8–1–1) | 6. |
| 7. | Delta State (2–0) | Jacksonville State (3–0) | Alcorn State (3–1) т | Tennessee State (5–1) | Montana State (5–1) | Tennessee State (6–1) | Western Illinois (7–1) | Eastern Kentucky (7–2) | UNLV (8–2) | 7. |
| 8. | UMass (2–0) (Note: In the actual printed polls, UMass was listed as Massachusetts) | Western Kentucky (2–0–1) | Eastern Illinois (4–0) т | Montana State (4–1) | Eastern Kentucky (5–1) | Delaware (4–2–1) | Akron (6–2) т | Troy State (7–1–1) | Alcorn State (7–2) т | 8. |
| 9. | UNLV (2–0) (Note: In the actual printed polls, UNLV was listed as Nevada Las Vegas) | Troy State (3–0–1) | Lehigh (3–1) | Eastern Kentucky (5–1) т | Tennessee Tech (5–1) | Western Illinois (6–1) | South Carolina State (7–1) т | UNLV (7–2) | South Carolina State (9–1) т | 9. |
| 10. | North Carolina A&T (2–0) т | Cal State Northridge (3–0) т (Note: In the actual printed polls, Cal State Northridge was listed as Northridge State) | Santa Clara (4–0) | Western Illinois (4–1) т | Tennessee State (5–1) т | Northern Arizona (5–1) | Troy State (6–1–1) | Western Illinois (7–2) | New Hampshire (8–2) т | 10. |
| 11. | Western Illinois (2–0) т | Eastern Illinois (3–0) т | | | Western Illinois (5–1) т | | | | North Dakota State (8–2) т | 11. |
| | Week 1 Sept 22 | Week 2 Sept 29 | Week 3 Oct 6 | Week 4 Oct 13 | Week 5 Oct 20 | Week 6 Oct 27 | Week 7 Nov 3 | Week 8 Nov 10 | Week 9 Nov 17 | |
| | | Dropped: 3 Montana State; 4 New Hampshire; 6 Western Carolina; 7 Delta State; 8 UMass; 10 North Carolina A&T | Dropped: 3 Tennessee State; 7 Jacksonville State; 8 Western Kentucky; 10 Cal State Northridge | Dropped: 5 Troy State; 8 Eastern Illinois; 9 Lehigh; 10 Santa Clara | None | Dropped: 6 UNLV; 8 Eastern Kentucky | Dropped: 5 Southern; 6 Tennessee Tech | Dropped: 4 Tennessee State; 6 Northern Arizona | Dropped: 10 Western Illinois | |

== HBCU rankings ==
Jet magazine ranked the top 1976 teams from historically black colleges and universities based on a poll of coaches and conference commissioners.

The poll was published on December 16.

- 1. South Carolina State (10–1)
- 2. Grambling State (8–4)
- 3. Alcorn State (8–2)
- 4. Alabama State (8–3)
- 5. Bethune-Cookman (9–2)
- 6. Norfolk State (8–3)
- 7. Southern (8–3)
- 8. Fort Valley State (8–2)
- 9. Tennessee State (7–2–1)
- 10. Knoxville (8–2)
- 11. Fayetteville State (7–3)
- 12. Virginia Union (7–4)
- 13. Hampton (7–4)
- 14. Tuskegee (7–2–1)
- 15. Morris Brown (5–4–1)
- 16. Central State (6–5)
- 17. Morgan State (6–4)
- 18. North Carolina A&T (6–4–1)
- 19. Jackson State (5–4)
- 20. Prairie View A&M (6–5) and Florida A&M (6–3–2)
