= Jack Doland =

American politician and college president

Biographical details
- Born: March 3, 1928; Lake Arthur, Louisiana, U.S.
- Died: April 25, 1991 (aged 63); Houston, Texas, U.S.

Playing career

Football
- 1946–1948: McNeese State
- 1949: Tulane

Baseball
- c. 1949: McNeese State
- 1950: Tulane
- 1950–1951: Crowley Millers

Coaching career (HC unless noted)

Football
- c. 1952: Sulphur HS (LA) (assistant)
- 1957–1958: McNeese State (line)
- 1959–1964: Sulphur HS (LA)
- 1965–1969: LSU (assistant)
- 1970–1978: McNeese State

Administrative career (AD unless noted)
- 1972–1980: McNeese State

Head coaching record
- Overall: 64–32–4 (college)
- Bowls: 1–1

Accomplishments and honors

Championships
- 1 SLC (1976)

Awards
- SLC Coach of the Year (1976)

Jack V. Doland (March 3, 1928 – April 25, 1991) was an American football coach, college athletics administrator, university president, and politician. He served as the head football coach at the McNeese State University from 1970 to 1978, compiling a record of 64–32–4. Doland was the athletic director at McNeese State from 1972 to 1980 and the president of the school from 1980 to 1987. He was elected to the Louisiana State Senate in 1987. Doland died of prostate cancer on April 25, 1991, at the MD Anderson Cancer Center in Houston, Texas.

== Head coaching record ==
=== College ===
Year	Team	Overall	Conference	Standing	Bowl/playoffs
McNeese State Cowboys (Gulf States Conference) (1970)
1970	McNeese State	5–6	2–3	T–4th	
McNeese State Cowboys (NCAA College Division independent) (1971)
1971	McNeese State	9–1–1			L Grantland Rice
McNeese State Cowboys (Southland Conference) (1972–1978)
1972	McNeese State	8–3	3–2	T–3rd	
1973	McNeese State	7–3–1	2–3	T–4th	
1974	McNeese State	6–4–1	2–3	4th	
1975	McNeese State	7–4	3–2	3rd	
1976	McNeese State	10–2	4–1	T–1st	W Independence
1977	McNeese State	5–5–1	1–3–1	5th	
1978	McNeese State	7–4	2–3	T–4th	
McNeese State:		64–32–4	19–20–1		
Total:		64–32–4			
National championship Conference title Conference division title or championship game berth
