= McNeese Cowboys football =

Intercollegiate American football team

2026 McNeese Cowboys football team
- First season: 1940; 86 years ago
- Athletic director: Bridget Martin
- Head coach: Matt Viator; 12th season, 83–40 (.675)
- Location: Lake Charles, Louisiana
- Stadium: Navarre Stadium (capacity: 17,610)
- NCAA division: Division I FCS
- Conference: Southland
- Colors: Royal blue and gold
- All-time record: 487–311–13 (.609)
- Bowl record: 3–3–1 (.500)

Conference championships
- SLC: 1976, 1979, 1980, 1991, 1993, 1995, 1997, 2001, 2002, 2003, 2006, 2007, 2009, 2015
- Rivalries: Central Arkansas (rivalry); Lamar (rivalry); Louisiana (rivalry); Northwestern State (rivalry)
- Fight song: "On Mcneese"
- Mascot: Rowdy
- Marching band: "The Pride of Mcneese"
- Website: McNeeseSports.com

The McNeese Cowboys football program is the intercollegiate American football team for McNeese State University located in the U.S. state of Louisiana. The team competes in the NCAA Division I Football Championship Subdivision (FCS) and are members of the Southland Conference. McNeese's first football team was fielded in 1940. The team plays its home games at the 17,410 seat Navarre Stadium in Lake Charles, Louisiana.

== History ==
On August 31, 2013, McNeese opened their season by defeating the South Florida Bulls, 53–21. It was the largest margin of victory (32 points) by a Football Championship Subdivision (FCS, formerly I-AA) team over a Football Bowl Subdivision (FBS, formerly I-A) team since the NCAA split Division I football into two divisions in 1978.

McNeese State football played some of their original games at a stadium now named Lake Charles Boston High School Cougar Stadium.

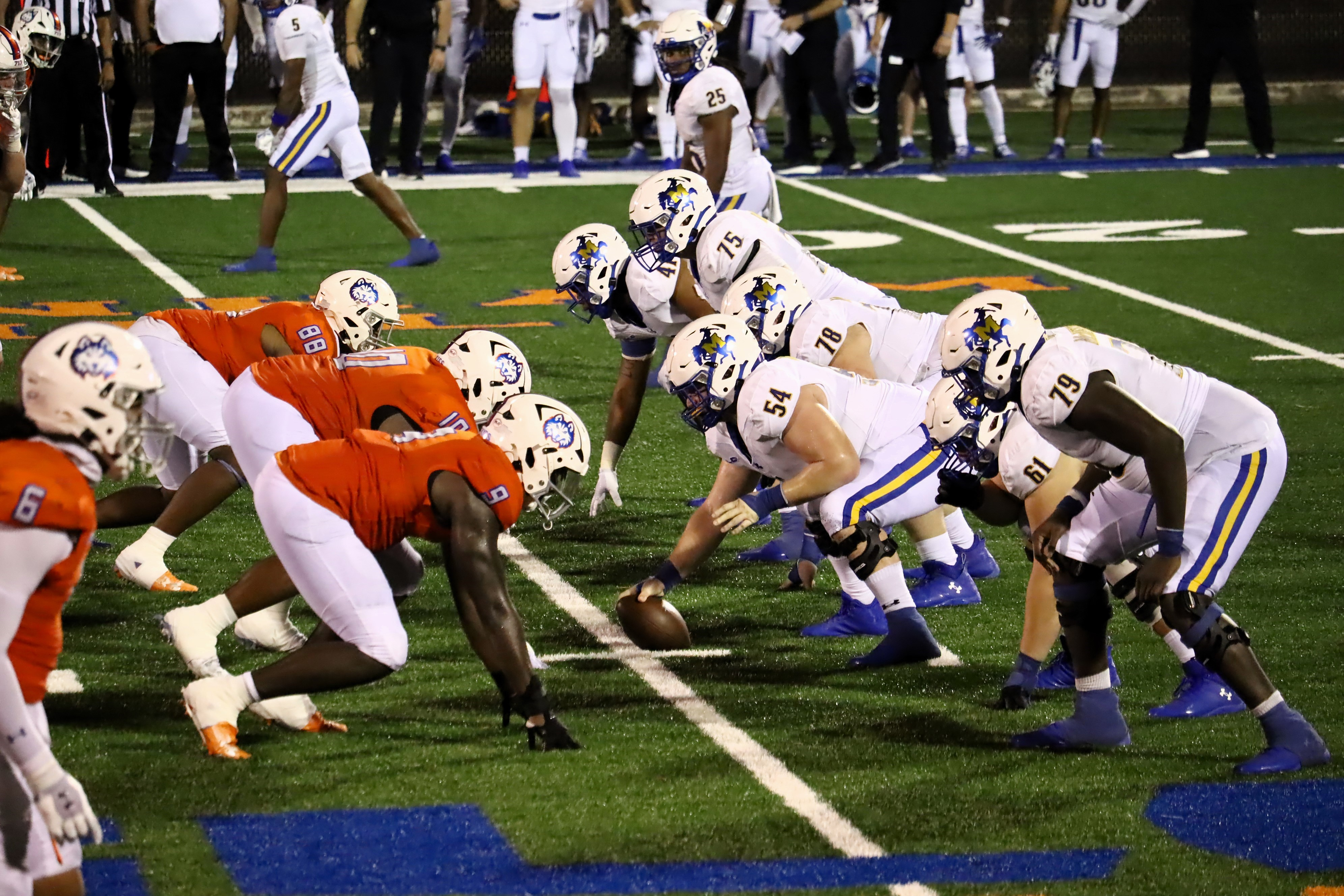
The Cowboys (right) line up on offense during a 2024 game against Houston Christian.

== Championships ==
=== Conference championships ===
McNeese has won fourteen Southland Conference championships.

Years	Conference	Overall Record	Conference Record
1976	Southland Conference	10–2	4–1
1979	Southland Conference	11–1	5–0
1980	Southland Conference	10–2	5–0
1991†	Southland Conference	6–4–2	4–1–2
1993	Southland Conference	10–3	7–0
1995	Southland Conference	13–1	5–0
1997†	Southland Conference	13–2	6–1
2001	Southland Conference	8–4	5–1
2002	Southland Conference	13–2	6–0
2003	Southland Conference	10–2	5–0
2006	Southland Conference	7–5	5–1
2007	Southland Conference	11–1	7–0
2009†	Southland Conference	9–3	6–1
2015	Southland Conference	10–1	9–0

† denotes co-champions

=== Division I-AA championship games ===
- 1997, L 9–10 to Youngstown State
- 2002, L 14–34 to Western Kentucky

== Bowl games ==
The Cowboys have participated in seven bowl games.

Season	Bowl	Opponent	Result
1947	Cajun Bowl	Southern Arkansas	T 0–0
1951	Cosmopolitan Bowl	Louisiana College	W 13–6
1962	Golden Isles Bowl	Howard (AL)	W 21–14
1971	Grantland Rice Bowl	Tennessee State	L 23–26
1976	Independence Bowl	Tulsa	W 20–16
1979	Independence Bowl	Syracuse	L 7–31
1980	Independence Bowl	Southern Miss	L 14–16

== Rivalries ==
=== Central Arkansas ===
The two teams have met 13 times on the football field with Central Arkansas leading the series 7–6. Due to conference scheduling requirements, the most recent game was played in 2019.

McNeese–Central Arkansas: All-Time Record
Games played	First meeting	Last meeting	McNeese wins	McNeese losses	Ties	Win %
13	September 17, 1994 (won 21–7)	October 12, 2019 (lost 31–40)	7	6	0	.538

=== Lamar ===
The two teams have met 43 times on the football field, with McNeese leading 29–13–1 in the series, along with an agreement with the two universities and Verizon Wireless.

McNeese–Lamar: All-Time Record
Games played	First meeting	Last meeting	McNeese wins	McNeese losses	Ties	Win %
43	November 10, 1951 (won 13–7)	November 22, 2025 (won 21–19)	29	13	1	.686

=== Louisiana ===
The Cajun Crown is the name of the rivalry trophy between Louisiana and McNeese, with McNeese leading 20–17–2 in the series.

Louisiana–McNeese: All-Time Record
Games played	First meeting	Last meeting	McNeese wins	McNeese losses	Ties	Win %
39	September 22, 1951 (lost 14–35)	September 6, 2025 (lost 10–34)	20	17	2	.538

=== Northwestern State ===
McNeese leads the series with Northwestern State 50–23–1 through the 2025 season.

McNeese–Northwestern State: All-Time Record
Games played	First meeting	Last meeting	McNeese wins	McNeese losses	Ties	Win %
74	October 6, 1951 (won 38–21)	November 1, 2025 (won 50–3)	50	23	1	.682

== Notable former players ==
Notable alumni include:

NFL

- Don Breaux - Denver (1963) and San Diego ('64-'65); also coordinated Washington Redskins (1981–1989, 1990–1993, 2004–2007) and various teams
- Tom Sestak - AFL Buffalo Bills (1962–1968)
- Leonard Smith - St. Louis/Phoenix Cardinals (1983-1988), Buffalo Bills (1988–1991) (College Football Hall of Famer)
- Stephen Starring - New England Patriots (1983–1987), Detroit Lions and Tampa Bay Buccaneers (1988)
- Buford Jordan - New Orleans/Portland Breakers (1984–1985) USFL, New Orleans Saints (1986–1992)
- Kavika Pittman - Dallas Cowboys (1996–99), Denver (2000–2002), Carolina (2003)
- Zach Bronson - San Francisco 49ers (1997–2003); St. Louis (2004)
- Kerry Joseph - Seattle Seahawks (1999–2002)
- Keith Ortego - Chicago Bears (1985–1987)
- Flip Johnson - Buffalo Bills (1988–1989)
- Bryan Hicks - Cincinnati Bengals (1980–1982)
- Jimmy Redmond – various teams (2001–2006)
- Luke Lawton - various teams (2005–2010)
- B. J. Sams - Baltimore Ravens (2004–2007); Kansas City Chiefs (2008)
- B. J. Blunt - Washington Redskins (2019)
- Diontae Spencer - St. Louis Rams (2014), Pittsburgh Steelers (2019), Denver Broncos (2019–2021), New York Jets (2022-2023)
- Adam Henry - Assistant coach: Oakland Raiders (2007-11), San Francisco 49ers (2015), New York Giants (2016-2017), Cleveland Browns (2018-2019), Dallas Cowboys (2020-2021), Buffalo Bills (2023-present)

CFL

- Kerry Joseph - Ottawa Renegades (2003–2005), Saskatchewan Roughriders (2006–2007, 2014), Toronto Argonauts (2008–2009), Edmonton Eskimos (2010–2013)
- Diontae Spencer - Toronto Argonauts (2015–2016), Ottawa Redblacks (2017–2018)

== Future non-conference opponents ==
Announced non-conference opponents as of September 7, 2026.

2026	2027	2028	2029
Texas Wesleyan	Louisiana Christian	at Louisiana	at Northern Arizona
Tarleton State	at Tarleton State	Northern Arizona	at LSU
at LSU			

== See also ==
- List of NCAA Division I FCS football programs
