= 1976 Bowling Green Falcons football team =

American college football season

1976 Bowling Green Falcons football
- Conference: Mid-American Conference
- Record: 6–5 (4–3 MAC)
- Head coach: Don Nehlen (9th season)
- Home stadium: Doyt Perry Stadium

1976 Mid-American Conference football standings
	Conf.					Overall
Team	W		L		T	W		L		T
Ball State $	4	–	1	–	0	8	–	3	–	0
Kent State	6	–	2	–	0	8	–	4	–	0
Ohio	6	–	2	–	0	7	–	4	–	0
Western Michigan	6	–	3	–	0	7	–	4	–	0
Central Michigan	4	–	3	–	0	7	–	4	–	0
Bowling Green	4	–	3	–	0	6	–	5	–	0
Miami (OH)	2	–	4	–	0	3	–	8	–	0
Toledo	2	–	6	–	0	3	–	8	–	0
Eastern Michigan	1	–	5	–	0	2	–	9	–	0
Northern Illinois	0	–	6	–	0	1	–	10	–	0
$ – Conference champion

The 1976 Bowling Green Falcons football team was an American football team that represented Bowling Green University in the Mid-American Conference (MAC) during the 1976 NCAA Division I football season. In their ninth season under head coach Don Nehlen, the Falcons compiled a 6–5 record (4–3 against MAC opponents), finished in sixth place in the MAC, and outscored their opponents by a combined total of 292 to 249.

The team's statistical leaders included Mark Miller with 1,839 passing yards, Dave Preston with 989 rushing yards, and Jeff Groth with 598 receiving yards.

== Schedule ==
Date	Opponent	Site	Result	Attendance	Source
September 11	at Syracuse*	Archbold Stadium; Syracuse, NY	W 22–7	23,859	
September 18	Eastern Michigan	Doyt Perry Stadium; Bowling Green, OH	W 53–12	12,605	
September 25	San Diego State*	San Diego Stadium; San Diego, CA	L 15–27	11,673	
October 2	at Western Michigan	Waldo Stadium; Kalamazoo, MI	W 31–28	19,500	
October 9	at Toledo	Glass Bowl; Toledo, OH (rivalry)	W 29–28	16,180	
October 16	Kent State	Doyt L. Perry Stadium; Bowling Green, OH (rivalry)	W 17–13	15,263	
October 23	at Miami (OH)	Miami Field; Oxford, OH	L 7–9	15,081	
October 30	Central Michigan	Doyt Perry Stadium; Bowling Green, OH	L 28–38		
November 6	Ohio	Doyt Perry Stadium; Bowling Green, OH	L 26–31	13,469	
November 13	Southern Illinois*	Doyt Perry Stadium; Bowling Green, OH	W 35–7		
November 20	at Chattanooga*	Chamberlain Field; Chattanooga, TN	L 29–49	4,600	
*Non-conference game
