= 1976 Virginia Cavaliers football team =

American college football season

1976 Virginia Cavaliers football
- Conference: Atlantic Coast Conference
- Record: 2–9 (1–3 ACC)
- Head coach: Dick Bestwick (1st season)
- Captains: Mike Ozdowski; James Wicks; Gregory McDaniel
- Home stadium: Scott Stadium

1976 Atlantic Coast Conference football standings
	Conf.					Overall
Team	W		L		T	W		L		T
No. 8 Maryland $	5	–	0	–	0	11	–	1	–	0
North Carolina	4	–	1	–	0	9	–	3	–	0
Wake Forest	3	–	3	–	0	5	–	6	–	0
Duke	2	–	3	–	1	5	–	5	–	1
NC State	2	–	3	–	0	3	–	7	–	1
Virginia	1	–	3	–	0	2	–	9	–	0
Clemson	0	–	4	–	1	3	–	6	–	2
$ – Conference champion; Rankings from AP Poll

The 1976 Virginia Cavaliers football team represented the University of Virginia during the 1976 NCAA Division I football season. The Cavaliers were led by first-year head coach Dick Bestwick and played their home games at Scott Stadium in Charlottesville, Virginia. They competed as members of the Atlantic Coast Conference, finishing in sixth.

== Schedule ==
Date	Opponent	Site	Result	Attendance	Source
September 11	at Washington*	Husky Stadium; Seattle, WA	L 17–38	37,500–40,412	
September 18	William & Mary*	Scott Stadium; Charlottesville, VA	L 0–14	26,000	
September 25	Duke^{†}	Scott Stadium; Charlottesville, VA	L 6–21	20,000	
October 2	at Georgia Tech*	Grant Field; Atlanta, GA	L 14–35	38,119	
October 9	at South Carolina*	Williams–Brice Stadium; Columbia, SC	L 7–35	47,239	
October 16	Virginia Tech*	Scott Stadium; Charlottesville, VA (rivalry)	L 10–14	32,618	
October 23	at Wake Forest	Groves Stadium; Winston-Salem, NC	W 18–17	18,300	
October 30	vs. VMI*	Foreman Field; Norfolk, VA (Oyster Bowl)	L 7–13	22,500	
November 6	Lehigh*	Scott Stadium; Charlottesville, VA	W 21–20	16,743	
November 13	at North Carolina	Kenan Memorial Stadium; Chapel Hill, NC (South's Oldest Rivalry)	L 6–31	48,000	
November 20	No. 6 Maryland	Scott Stadium; Charlottesville, VA (rivalry)	L 0–28	23,100	
*Non-conference game; ^{†}Homecoming; Rankings from AP Poll released prior to the game
