= 1976 Duke Blue Devils football team =

American college football season

1976 Duke Blue Devils football
- Conference: Atlantic Coast Conference
- Record: 5–5–1 (2–3–1 ACC)
- Head coach: Mike McGee (6th season)
- Defensive coordinator: John Gutekunst (1st season)
- MVP: Billy Bryan
- Captains: Tony Benjamin; Billy Bryan; Bob Grupp
- Home stadium: Wallace Wade Stadium

1976 Atlantic Coast Conference football standings
	Conf.					Overall
Team	W		L		T	W		L		T
No. 8 Maryland $	5	–	0	–	0	11	–	1	–	0
North Carolina	4	–	1	–	0	9	–	3	–	0
Wake Forest	3	–	3	–	0	5	–	6	–	0
Duke	2	–	3	–	1	5	–	5	–	1
NC State	2	–	3	–	0	3	–	7	–	1
Virginia	1	–	3	–	0	2	–	9	–	0
Clemson	0	–	4	–	1	3	–	6	–	2
$ – Conference champion; Rankings from AP Poll

The 1976 Duke Blue Devils football team was an American football team that represented Duke University as a member of the Atlantic Coast Conference (ACC) during the 1976 NCAA Division I football season. In their sixth year under head coach Mike McGee, the Blue Devils compiled an overall record of 5–5–1, with a conference record of 2–3–1, and finished fourth in the ACC.

== Schedule ==
Date	Opponent	Site	Result	Attendance	Source
September 11	at Tennessee*	Neyland Stadium; Knoxville, TN	W 21–18	82,687	
September 18	at South Carolina*	Williams–Brice Stadium; Columbia, SC	L 6–24	52,237	
September 25	at Virginia	Scott Stadium; Charlottesville, VA	W 21–6	20,000	
October 2	No. 2 Pittsburgh*	Wallace Wade Stadium; Durham, NC	L 31–44	37,200	
October 9	at Miami (FL)*	Miami Orange Bowl; Miami, FL	W 20–7	13,811–13,818	
October 16	at Clemson	Memorial Stadium; Clemson, SC	T 18–18	41,500	
October 23	No. 6 Maryland^{†}	Wallace Wade Stadium; Durham, NC	L 3–30	20,200	
October 30	Georgia Tech*	Wallace Wade Stadium; Durham, NC	W 31–7	30,300	
November 6	Wake Forest	Wallace Wade Stadium; Durham, NC (rivalry)	L 17–38	23,600	
November 13	at NC State	Carter Stadium; Raleigh, NC (rivalry)	W 28–14	41,600	
November 20	at North Carolina	Kenan Stadium; Chapel Hill, NC (Victory Bell)	L 38–39	48,000	
*Non-conference game; ^{†}Homecoming; Rankings from AP Poll released prior to the game
