= Cajun Bowl =

Cajun Bowl (defunct)
- Location: Lake Charles, Louisiana
- Operated: 1947

The Cajun Bowl was a one-time postseason college football bowl game held in 1947 in Lake Charles, Louisiana. The game featured McNeese State and Magnolia A&M (now known as Southern Arkansas). Magnolia A&M entered the game after posting a season record of 9–2. The final result was a scoreless tie.

== Results ==
Date	Year	Site	Team		Team	
December	1947	Lake Charles, Louisiana	McNeese State	0	Magnolia A&M	0
