= 1976 Maryland Terrapins football team =

American college football season

1976 Maryland Terrapins football

ACC champion

Cotton Bowl Classic, L 21–30 vs. Houston
- Conference: Atlantic Coast Conference

Ranking
- Coaches: No. 11
- AP: No. 8
- Record: 11–1 (5–0 ACC)
- Head coach: Jerry Claiborne (5th season)
- Home stadium: Byrd Stadium

1976 Atlantic Coast Conference football standings
	Conf.					Overall
Team	W		L		T	W		L		T
No. 8 Maryland $	5	–	0	–	0	11	–	1	–	0
North Carolina	4	–	1	–	0	9	–	3	–	0
Wake Forest	3	–	3	–	0	5	–	6	–	0
Duke	2	–	3	–	1	5	–	5	–	1
NC State	2	–	3	–	0	3	–	7	–	1
Virginia	1	–	3	–	0	2	–	9	–	0
Clemson	0	–	4	–	1	3	–	6	–	2
$ – Conference champion; Rankings from AP Poll

The 1976 Maryland Terrapins football team represented University of Maryland in the 1976 NCAA Division I football season. The Terrapins offense scored 294 points while the defense allowed 115 points. Led by head coach Jerry Claiborne, the Terrapins appeared in the Cotton Bowl Classic after winning the Atlantic Coast Conference title with a flawless 5-0 conference record.

== Schedule ==
Date	Opponent	Rank	Site	Result	Attendance	Source
September 11	Richmond*	No. 12	Byrd Stadium; College Park, MD	W 31–7	41,088	
September 18	at West Virginia*	No. 10	Mountaineer Field; Morgantown, WV (rivalry)	W 24–3	35,107	
September 25	at Syracuse*	No. 8	Archbold Stadium; Syracuse, NY	W 42–28	21,109	
October 2	Villanova*	No. 7	Byrd Stadium; College Park, MD	W 20–9	38,131	
October 9	at NC State	No. 7	Carter Stadium; Raleigh, NC	W 16–6	38,500	
October 16	Wake Forest	No. 5	Byrd Stadium; College Park, MD	W 17–15	46,321	
October 23	at Duke	No. 6	Wallace Wade Stadium; Durham, NC	W 30–3	20,200	
October 30	Kentucky*	No. 5	Byrd Stadium; College Park, MD	W 24–14	43,013	
November 6	Cincinnati*	No. 6	Byrd Stadium; College Park, MD	W 21–0	45,315	
November 13	Clemson^{†}	No. 6	Byrd Stadium; College Park, MD	W 20–0	40,288	
November 20	at Virginia	No. 6	Scott Stadium; Charlottesville, VA (rivalry)	W 28–0	23,100	
January 1	vs. No. 6 Houston*	No. 4	Cotton Bowl; Dallas, TX (Cotton Bowl Classic)	L 21–30	58,500	
*Non-conference game; ^{†}Homecoming; Rankings from AP Poll released prior to the game

== Roster ==
1976 Maryland Terrapins football team roster
Players
Coaches
Offense

Pos.	#	Name	Class
WR	22	Jim Hagan	Jr
WR		Vince Kinney	Jr
QB	13	Mark Manges	Jr
TE	86	Bob Raba	Sr

Defense

Pos.	#	Name	Class
DT	79	Joe Campbell	Sr

Special teams

Pos.	#	Name	Class

Head coach

- Jerry Claiborne

Coordinators/assistant coaches

Legend

- (C) Team captain
- (S) Suspended
- (I) Ineligible
- Injured
- Redshirt

== 1977 NFL draft ==
The following players were selected in the 1977 NFL draft.

Player	Position	Round	Overall	NFL team
Joe Campbell	Defensive tackle	1	7	New Orleans Saints
Tim Wilson	Fullback	3	66	Houston Oilers
Ed Fulton	Guard	3	68	Los Angeles Rams
Tom Schick	Guard	6	162	New Orleans Saints
Dave Conrad	Tackle	12	313	New York Jets
