= 1976 Eastern Michigan Hurons football team =

American college football season

1976 Eastern Michigan Hurons football
- Conference: Mid-American Conference
- Record: 2–9 (1–5 MAC)
- Head coach: Ed Chlebek (1st season)
- Captains: Darrion Price; Rod Slater
- Home stadium: Rynearson Stadium

1976 Mid-American Conference football standings
	Conf.					Overall
Team	W		L		T	W		L		T
Ball State $	4	–	1	–	0	8	–	3	–	0
Kent State	6	–	2	–	0	8	–	4	–	0
Ohio	6	–	2	–	0	7	–	4	–	0
Western Michigan	6	–	3	–	0	7	–	4	–	0
Central Michigan	4	–	3	–	0	7	–	4	–	0
Bowling Green	4	–	3	–	0	6	–	5	–	0
Miami (OH)	2	–	4	–	0	3	–	8	–	0
Toledo	2	–	6	–	0	3	–	8	–	0
Eastern Michigan	1	–	5	–	0	2	–	9	–	0
Northern Illinois	0	–	6	–	0	1	–	10	–	0
$ – Conference champion

The 1976 Eastern Michigan Hurons football team represented Eastern Michigan University in the 1976 NCAA Division I football season. In their first season under head coach Ed Chlebek, the Hurons compiled a 2–9 record (1–5 against conference opponents), finished in ninth place in the Mid-American Conference, and were outscored by their opponents, 355 to 132. The team's statistical leaders included Steve Raklovits with 954 passing yards, Bobby Windom with 824 rushing yards, and Carlos Henderson with 328 receiving yards.

== Schedule ==
Date	Opponent	Site	Result	Attendance	Source
September 4	Ohio	Rynearson Stadium; Ypsilanti, MI	L 7–23	11,200	
September 11	at Western Michigan	Waldo Stadium; Kalamazoo, MI	L 13–31	19,200	
September 18	at Bowling Green	Doyt Perry Stadium; Bowling Green, OH	L 12–53	12,605	
September 26	at McNeese State*	Cowboy Stadium; Lake Charles, LA	L 10–23		
October 2	Northern Michigan*	Rynearson Stadium; Ypsilanti, MI	L 6–28	12,240	
October 9	Arkansas State*^{†}	Rynearson Stadium; Ypsilanti, MI	W 32–30		
October 23	at Akron *	Rubber Bowl; Akron, OH	L 0–36	9,042	
October 30	at Kent State	Dix Stadium; Kent, OH	L 13–38	6,224	
November 6	Central Michigan	Rynearson Stadium; Ypsilanti, MI (rivalry)	W 30–27	12,300	
November 13	at Illinois State *	Hancock Stadium; Normal, IL	L 6–14	4,000	
November 20	Ball State	Rynearson Stadium; Ypsilanti, MI	L 3–52	2,500	
*Non-conference game; ^{†}Homecoming

== After the season ==
The following Hurons were selected in the 1977 NFL draft after the season.

Round	Pick	Player	Position	NFL club
10	264	Mark Carter	Tight end	Miami Dolphins
12	319	Jim Stansik	Tight end	San Diego Chargers
