= 1976 East Carolina Pirates football team =

American college football season

1976 East Carolina Pirates football

SoCon champion
- Conference: Southern Conference
- Record: 9–2 (4–1 SoCon)
- Head coach: Pat Dye (3rd season)
- Home stadium: Ficklen Memorial Stadium

1976 Southern Conference football standings
	Conf.					Overall
Team	W		L		T	W		L		T
East Carolina $	4	–	1	–	0	9	–	2	–	0
William & Mary	3	–	2	–	0	7	–	4	–	0
Appalachian State	2	–	2	–	1	6	–	4	–	1
Furman	2	–	2	–	1	6	–	4	–	1
VMI	2	–	3	–	0	5	–	5	–	0
The Citadel	1	–	4	–	0	6	–	5	–	0
Davidson	0	–	0	–	0	2	–	6	–	1
$ – Conference champion

The 1976 East Carolina Pirates football team was an American football team that represented East Carolina University as a member of the Southern Conference during the 1976 NCAA Division I football season. In their third season under head coach Pat Dye, the team compiled a 9–2 record.

== Schedule ==
Date	Opponent	Rank	Site	Result	Attendance	Source
September 11	Southern Miss*		Ficklen Memorial Stadium; Greenville, NC	W 48–0	17,400	
September 18	at NC State*		Carter Stadium; Raleigh, NC (rivalry)	W 23–14	49,700	
September 25	at William & Mary		Cary Field; Williamsburg, VA	W 20–19	13,500	
October 2	The Citadel		Ficklen Memorial Stadium; Greenville, NC	W 22–3	18,250	
October 9	Southern Illinois*		Ficklen Memorial Stadium; Greenville, NC	W 49–14	16,200	
October 16	at VMI		Alumni Memorial Field; Lexington, VA	W 17–3	7,700	
October 23	at North Carolina*	No. 20	Kenan Memorial Stadium; Chapel Hill, NC	L 10–12	49,000	
October 30	Western Carolina*		Ficklen Stadium; Greenville, NC	W 24–17	21,506	
November 6	at Richmond*		City Stadium; Richmond, VA	W 20–10	15,500	
November 13	at Furman		Sirrine Stadium; Greenville, SC	L 10–17	13,600	
November 25	Appalachian State		Ficklen Memorial Stadium; Greenville, NC	W 35–7	15,335	
*Non-conference game; Rankings from AP Poll released prior to the game

== Roster ==
1976 East Carolina Pirates football team roster
Players
Coaches
Offense

Pos.	#	Name	Class

Defense

Pos.	#	Name	Class
S	23	Jim Bolding	Sr
CB		Reggie Pinkney	Sr

Special teams

Pos.	#	Name	Class

Head coach

- Pat Dye

Coordinators/assistant coaches

Legend

- (C) Team captain
- (S) Suspended
- (I) Ineligible
- Injured
- Redshirt
