= 1976 Clemson Tigers football team =

American college football season

1976 Clemson Tigers football
- Conference: Atlantic Coast Conference
- Record: 3–6–2 (0–4–1 ACC)
- Head coach: Red Parker (4th season)
- Offensive coordinator: Don Murry (3rd season)
- Defensive coordinator: Charley Pell (1st season)
- Captains: Malcolm Marler; Mike O'Cain; Randy Scott; Joey Walters
- Home stadium: Memorial Stadium

1976 Atlantic Coast Conference football standings
	Conf.					Overall
Team	W		L		T	W		L		T
No. 8 Maryland $	5	–	0	–	0	11	–	1	–	0
North Carolina	4	–	1	–	0	9	–	3	–	0
Wake Forest	3	–	3	–	0	5	–	6	–	0
Duke	2	–	3	–	1	5	–	5	–	1
NC State	2	–	3	–	0	3	–	7	–	1
Virginia	1	–	3	–	0	2	–	9	–	0
Clemson	0	–	4	–	1	3	–	6	–	2
$ – Conference champion; Rankings from AP Poll

The 1976 Clemson Tigers football team was an American football team that represented Clemson University in the Atlantic Coast Conference (ACC) during the 1976 NCAA Division I football season. In its fourth and final season under head coach Red Parker, the team compiled a 3–6–2 record (0–4–1 against conference opponents), finished in last place in the ACC, and was outscored by a total of 237 to 172. The team played its home games at Memorial Stadium in Clemson, South Carolina.

Malcolm Marler, Mike O'Cain, Randy Scott, and Joey Walters were the team captains. The team's statistical leaders included Steve Fuller with 835 passing yards and 36 points scored (6 touchdowns), Warren Ratchford with 676 rushing yards, and Jerry Butler with 484 receiving yards.

== Schedule ==
Date	Time	Opponent	Site	Result	Attendance	Source
September 11	1:00 p.m.	The Citadel*	Memorial Stadium; Clemson, SC	W 10–7	45,600	
September 18	3:50 p.m.	No. 9 Georgia*	Memorial Stadium; Clemson, SC (rivalry)	L 0–41	41,100	
September 25	7:30 p.m.	at Georgia Tech*	Grant Field; Atlanta, GA (rivalry)	T 24–24	43,397	
October 2	2:00 p.m.	at Tennessee*	Neyland Stadium; Knoxville, TN	L 19–21	78,161	
October 9	1:30 p.m.	at Wake Forest	Groves Stadium; Winston-Salem, NC	L 14–20	18,000	
October 16	1:00 p.m.	Duke^{†}	Memorial Stadium; Clemson, SC	T 18–18	41,500	
October 23	1:30 p.m.	at NC State	Carter Stadium; Raleigh, NC (rivalry)	L 21–38	36,500	
October 30	7:30 p.m.	at Florida State*	Doak Campbell Stadium; Tallahassee, FL (rivalry)	W 15–12	21,473	
November 6	1:00 p.m.	North Carolina	Memorial Stadium; Clemson, SC	L 23–27	39,200	
November 13	1:30 p.m.	at No. 6 Maryland	Byrd Stadium; College Park, MD	L 0–20	40,288	
November 20	1:00 p.m.	South Carolina*	Memorial Stadium; Clemson, SC (rivalry)	W 28–9	54,129	
*Non-conference game; ^{†}Homecoming; Rankings from AP Poll released prior to the game; All times are in Eastern time
