= 1976 Indiana State Sycamores football team =

American college football season

1976 Indiana State Sycamores football
- Conference: Independent
- Record: 3–7
- Head coach: Tom Harp (4th season)
- Home stadium: Memorial Stadium

1976 NCAA Division I independents football records
	Conf.			Overall
Team	W	L	T	W		L		T
No. 1 Pittsburgh		–		12	–	0	–	0
No. 17 Rutgers		–		11	–	0	–	0
San Diego State		–		10	–	1	–	0
No. 12 Notre Dame		–		9	–	3	–	0
Colgate		–		8	–	2	–	0
Boston College		–		8	–	3	–	0
Cincinnati		–		8	–	3	–	0
Memphis State		–		7	–	4	–	0
North Texas State *		–		7	–	4	–	0
Southern Illinois		–		7	–	4	–	0
Penn State		–		7	–	5	–	0
Villanova		–		6	–	4	–	1
South Carolina		–		6	–	5	–	0
Virginia Tech		–		6	–	5	–	0
Army		–		5	–	6	–	0
Florida State		–		5	–	6	–	0
Illinois State		–		5	–	6	–	0
Richmond		–		5	–	6	–	0
West Virginia		–		5	–	6	–	0
Georgia Tech		–		4	–	6	–	1
Temple		–		4	–	6	–	0
Air Force		–		4	–	7	–	0
Dayton		–		4	–	7	–	0
Louisville		–		4	–	7	–	0
Marshall		–		4	–	7	–	0
Navy		–		4	–	7	–	0
Indiana State		–		3	–	7	–	0
Hawaii		–		3	–	8	–	0
Holy Cross		–		3	–	8	–	0
Miami (FL)		–		3	–	8	–	0
Syracuse		–		3	–	8	–	0
Utah State		–		3	–	8	–	0
Northeast Louisiana		–		2	–	9	–	0
Southern Miss		–		2	–	9	–	0
Tulane		–		2	–	9	–	0
North Texas State (originally 6–5) was awarded a forfeit win after Mississippi State was found to be using an ineligible player.; Rankings from AP Poll

The 1976 Indiana State Sycamores football team represented Indiana State University as an independent during the 1976 NCAA Division I football season. In their fourth season under head coach Tom Harp, the Sycamores compiled a 3–7 record.

== Schedule ==
Date	Opponent	Site	Result	Attendance	Source
September 18	Arkansas State	Memorial Stadium; Terre Haute, IN	W 31–21		
September 25	Dayton	Memorial Stadium; Terre Haute, IN	L 14–20		
October 2	Akron	Memorial Stadium; Terre Haute, IN	L 7–34	8,318	
October 9	Northern Illinois	Memorial Stadium; Terre Haute, IN	W 28–10	15,074	
October 16	at Central Michigan	Perry Shorts Stadium; Mount Pleasant, MI	L 13–16	20,265	
October 23	at Illinois State	Hancock Stadium; Normal, IL	L 14–24	7,500	
October 30	Southern Illinois	Memorial Stadium; Terre Haute, IN	L 2–21	3,200	
November 6	at Ball State	Ball State Stadium; Muncie, IN (rivalry)	L 9–24	12,106	
November 13	at Wichita State	Cessna Stadium; Wichita, KS	W 20–17	3,019	
November 20	at VMI	Alumni Memorial Field; Lexington, VA	L 14–26	5,300	
