= 1976 The Citadel Bulldogs football team =

American college football season

1976 The Citadel Bulldogs football
- Conference: Southern Conference
- Record: 6–5 (1–4 SoCon)
- Head coach: Bobby Ross (4th season)
- Home stadium: Johnson Hagood Stadium

1976 Southern Conference football standings
	Conf.					Overall
Team	W		L		T	W		L		T
East Carolina $	4	–	1	–	0	9	–	2	–	0
William & Mary	3	–	2	–	0	7	–	4	–	0
Appalachian State	2	–	2	–	1	6	–	4	–	1
Furman	2	–	2	–	1	6	–	4	–	1
VMI	2	–	3	–	0	5	–	5	–	0
The Citadel	1	–	4	–	0	6	–	5	–	0
Davidson	0	–	0	–	0	2	–	6	–	1
$ – Conference champion

The 1976 The Citadel Bulldogs football team represented The Citadel, The Military College of South Carolina in the 1976 NCAA Division I football season. Bobby Ross served as head coach for the fourth season. The Bulldogs played as members of the Southern Conference and played home games at Johnson Hagood Stadium.

== Schedule ==
Date	Opponent	Site	Result	Attendance	Source
September 11	at Clemson*	Memorial Stadium; Clemson, SC	L 7–10	45,600	
September 18	Delaware*	Johnson Hagood Stadium; Charleston, SC	W 17–15	21,570	
September 25	at Furman	Sirrine Stadium; Greenville, SC (rivalry)	W 17–16	17,200	
October 2	at East Carolina	Ficklen Memorial Stadium; Greenville, NC	L 3–22	18,250	
October 9	Chattanooga*	Johnson Hagood Stadium; Charleston, SC	W 14–10	17,985	
October 16	Richmond*	Johnson Hagood Stadium; Charleston, SC	W 20–7	16,745	
October 23	at Air Force*	Falcon Stadium; Colorado Springs, CO	W 26–7	29,113	
October 30	at Appalachian State	Conrad Stadium; Boone, NC	L 13–31	12,208	
November 6	VMI	Johnson Hagood Stadium; Charleston, SC (rivalry)	L 14–30	18,745	
November 13	at William & Mary	Cary Field; Williamsburg, VA	L 0–22	10,000	
November 20	Davidson*^{†}	Johnson Hagood Stadium; Charleston, SC	W 40–6	15,785	
*Non-conference game; ^{†}Homecoming
