= 1976 Appalachian State Mountaineers football team =

American college football season

1976 Appalachian State Mountaineers football
- Conference: Southern Conference
- Record: 6–4–1 (2–2–1 SoCon)
- Head coach: Jim Brakefield (6th season)
- Home stadium: Conrad Stadium

1976 Southern Conference football standings
	Conf.					Overall
Team	W		L		T	W		L		T
East Carolina $	4	–	1	–	0	9	–	2	–	0
William & Mary	3	–	2	–	0	7	–	4	–	0
Appalachian State	2	–	2	–	1	6	–	4	–	1
Furman	2	–	2	–	1	6	–	4	–	1
VMI	2	–	3	–	0	5	–	5	–	0
The Citadel	1	–	4	–	0	6	–	5	–	0
Davidson	0	–	0	–	0	2	–	6	–	1
$ – Conference champion

The 1976 Appalachian State Mountaineers football team was an American football team that represented Appalachian State University as a member of the Southern Conference (SoCon) during the 1976 NCAA Division I football season. In their sixth year under head coach Jim Brakefield, the Mountaineers compiled an overall record of 6–4–1 with a mark of 2–2–1 in conference play, and finished third in the SoCon.

== Schedule ==
Date	Opponent	Site	Result	Attendance	Source
September 4	at South Carolina*	Williams–Brice Stadium; Columbia, SC	L 10–21	44,536	
September 11	East Tennessee State*	Conrad Stadium; Boone, NC	W 44–3	12,330	
September 18	at VMI	Alumni Memorial Field; Lexington, VA	W 31–12	6,600	
September 25	Wofford*	Conrad Stadium; Boone, NC	W 42–0	10,120	
October 2	Western Carolina	Conrad Stadium; Boone, NC (rivalry)	W 24–17	15,068	
October 9	Furman	Conrad Stadium; Boone, NC	T 14–14	8,240	
October 16	at Lenoir Rhyne*	Moretz Stadium; Hickory, NC	W 45–7	8,300	
October 23	at Ball State*	Ball State Stadium; Muncie, IN	L 7–20	3,325	
October 30	The Citadel	Conrad Stadium; Boone, NC	W 31–13	12,208	
November 6	at William & Mary	Cary Field; Williamsburg, VA	L 22–23	10,000	
November 25	at East Carolina	Ficklen Memorial Stadium; Greenville, NC	L 7–35	15,335	
*Non-conference game
