= 1976 Dayton Flyers football team =

American college football season

1976 Dayton Flyers football
- Conference: Independent
- Record: 4–7
- Head coach: Ron Marciniak (4th season)
- Home stadium: Welcome Stadium

1976 NCAA Division I independents football records
	Conf.			Overall
Team	W	L	T	W		L		T
No. 1 Pittsburgh		–		12	–	0	–	0
No. 17 Rutgers		–		11	–	0	–	0
San Diego State		–		10	–	1	–	0
No. 12 Notre Dame		–		9	–	3	–	0
Colgate		–		8	–	2	–	0
Boston College		–		8	–	3	–	0
Cincinnati		–		8	–	3	–	0
Memphis State		–		7	–	4	–	0
North Texas State *		–		7	–	4	–	0
Southern Illinois		–		7	–	4	–	0
Penn State		–		7	–	5	–	0
Villanova		–		6	–	4	–	1
South Carolina		–		6	–	5	–	0
Virginia Tech		–		6	–	5	–	0
Army		–		5	–	6	–	0
Florida State		–		5	–	6	–	0
Illinois State		–		5	–	6	–	0
Richmond		–		5	–	6	–	0
West Virginia		–		5	–	6	–	0
Georgia Tech		–		4	–	6	–	1
Temple		–		4	–	6	–	0
Air Force		–		4	–	7	–	0
Dayton		–		4	–	7	–	0
Louisville		–		4	–	7	–	0
Marshall		–		4	–	7	–	0
Navy		–		4	–	7	–	0
Indiana State		–		3	–	7	–	0
Hawaii		–		3	–	8	–	0
Holy Cross		–		3	–	8	–	0
Miami (FL)		–		3	–	8	–	0
Syracuse		–		3	–	8	–	0
Utah State		–		3	–	8	–	0
Northeast Louisiana		–		2	–	9	–	0
Southern Miss		–		2	–	9	–	0
Tulane		–		2	–	9	–	0
North Texas State (originally 6–5) was awarded a forfeit win after Mississippi State was found to be using an ineligible player.; Rankings from AP Poll

The 1976 Dayton Flyers football team represented the University of Dayton as an independent during the 1976 NCAA Division I football season. In their fourth season under head coach Ron Marciniak, the Flyers compiled a 4–7 record.

== Schedule ==
Date	Opponent	Site	Result	Attendance	Source
September 3	Eastern Kentucky	Welcome Stadium; Dayton, OH	L 7–21	10,231	
September 11	Youngstown State	Welcome Stadium; Dayton, OH	W 41–16	8,032	
September 18	Villanova	Welcome Stadium; Dayton, OH	L 30–31	8,500	
September 25	at Indiana State	Memorial Stadium; Terre Haute, IN	W 20–14		
October 2	Ball State	Welcome Stadium; Dayton, OH	L 13–20		
October 9	at Akron	Rubber Bowl; Akron, OH	L 6–27	7,439	
October 16	at Marshall	Fairfield Stadium; Huntington, WV	L 0–9		
October 23	Toledo	Welcome Stadium; Dayton, OH	W 17–14		
November 6	at Northeast Louisiana	Brown Stadium; Monroe, LA	W 37–13		
November 13	at Temple	Veterans Stadium; Philadelphia, PA	L 6–35	7,429	
November 20	at Miami (OH)	Miami Field; Oxford, OH	L 8–28		
