= 1976 McNeese State Cowboys football team =

American college football season

1976 McNeese State Cowboys football

Southland champion

Independence Bowl, W 20–16 vs. Tulsa
- Conference: Southland Conference
- Record: 10–2 (4–1 Southland)
- Head coach: Jack Doland (7th season)
- Home stadium: Cowboy Stadium

1976 Southland Conference football standings
	Conf.					Overall
Team	W		L		T	W		L		T
McNeese State $	4	–	1	–	0	10	–	2	–	0
Southwestern Louisiana	4	–	1	–	0	7	–	4	–	0
UT Arlington	3	–	2	–	0	5	–	6	–	0
Louisiana Tech	2	–	3	–	0	6	–	5	–	0
Arkansas State	2	–	3	–	0	5	–	6	–	0
Lamar	0	–	5	–	0	2	–	9	–	0
$ – Conference champion; Southwestern Louisiana forfeited 2 non-conference season wins.

The 1976 McNeese State Cowboys football team was an American football team that represented McNeese State University as a member of the Southland Conference (Southland) during the 1976 NCAA Division I football season. In their seventh year under head coach Jack Doland, the team compiled an overall record of 10–2 with a mark of 4–1 in conference play, and were Southland champions. After the regular season, the Cowboys defeated Tulsa in the Independence Bowl.

== Schedule ==
Date	Opponent	Site	Result	Attendance	Source
September 11	Southern Illinois*	Cowboy Stadium; Lake Charles, LA	W 38–0	15,000	
September 18	at Louisiana Tech	Joe Aillet Stadium; Ruston, LA	W 15–13	17,734	
September 25	Eastern Michigan*	Cowboy Stadium; Lake Charles, LA	W 23–10		
October 2	Marshall*	Cowboy Stadium; Lake Charles, LA	W 34–9		
October 9	at Northeast Louisiana*	Brown Stadium; Monroe, LA	W 36–35		
October 16	UT Arlington	Cowboy Stadium; Lake Charles, LA	L 10–27	15,000	
October 23	at Arkansas State	Indian Stadium; Jonesboro, AR	W 24–21		
October 30	at West Texas State*	Kimbrough Memorial Stadium; Canyon, TX	L 25–30	5,000	
November 6	Northwestern State*	Cowboy Stadium; Lake Charles, LA (rivalry)	W 24–15	12,000	
November 13	at Lamar	Cardinal Stadium; Beaumont, TX (rivalry)	W 27–0		
November 20	Southwestern Louisiana	Cowboy Stadium; Lake Charles, LA (rivalry)	W 20–19		
December 13	vs. Tulsa*	State Fair Stadium; Shreveport, LA (Independence Bowl)	W 20–16	15,542–19,164	
*Non-conference game
