= 1976 William & Mary Indians football team =

American college football season

1976 William & Mary Indians football
- Conference: Southern Conference
- Record: 7–4 (3–2 SoCon)
- Head coach: Jim Root (5th season)
- Captains: Jack Kroeger; Jeff Hosmer
- Home stadium: Cary Field

1976 Southern Conference football standings
| | Conf. | | | | | Overall |
| Team | W | | L | | T | W | | L | | T |
|---|---|---|---|---|---|---|---|---|---|---|
| East Carolina $ | 4 | – | 1 | – | 0 | 9 | – | 2 | – | 0 |
| William & Mary | 3 | – | 2 | – | 0 | 7 | – | 4 | – | 0 |
| Appalachian State | 2 | – | 2 | – | 1 | 6 | – | 4 | – | 1 |
| Furman | 2 | – | 2 | – | 1 | 6 | – | 4 | – | 1 |
| VMI | 2 | – | 3 | – | 0 | 5 | – | 5 | – | 0 |
| The Citadel | 1 | – | 4 | – | 0 | 6 | – | 5 | – | 0 |
| Davidson | 0 | – | 0 | – | 0 | 2 | – | 6 | – | 1 |
$ – Conference champion

The 1976 William & Mary Indians football team represented the College of William & Mary as a member of the Southern Conference (SoCon) during the 1976 NCAA Division I football season. Led by Jim Root in his fifth year as head coach, William & Mary finished the season 7–4 overall and 3–2 in SoCon play to place second.

== Schedule ==
| Date | Opponent | Site | Result | Attendance | Source |
|---|---|---|---|---|---|
| September 11 | VMI | Cary Field; Williamsburg, VA (rivalry) | W 34–20 | 11,200 | |
| September 18 | at Virginia* | Scott Stadium; Charlottesville, VA | W 14–0 | 26,000 | |
| September 25 | East Carolina* | Cary Field; Williamsburg, VA | L 19–20 | 13,500 | |
| October 2 | at Virginia Tech* | Lane Stadium; Blacksburg, VA | W 27–15 | 35,000 | |
| October 9 | Delaware*^{†} | Cary Field; Williamsburg, VA (rivalry) | L 13–15 | 15,500 | |
| October 16 | at Navy* | Navy–Marine Corps Memorial Stadium; Annapolis, MD | W 21–13 | 21,681 | |
| October 23 | at Ohio* | Peden Stadium; Athens, OH | W 20–0 | 13,650 | |
| October 30 | at Furman | Sirrine Stadium; Greenville, SC | L 7–23 | 7,000 | |
| November 6 | Appalachian State | Cary Field; Williamsburg, VA | W 23–22 | 10,000 | |
| November 13 | The Citadel | Cary Field; Williamsburg, VA | W 22–0 | 10,000 | |
| November 20 | at Richmond* | City Stadium; Richmond, VA (rivalry) | L 10–21 | 18,500 | |
*Non-conference game; ^{†}Homecoming
