= 1976 NC State Wolfpack football team =

American college football season

1976 NC State Wolfpack football
- Conference: Atlantic Coast Conference
- Record: 3–7–1 (2–3 ACC)
- Head coach: Bo Rein (1st season)
- Offensive coordinator: Brian Burke (5th season)
- Home stadium: Carter Stadium

1976 Atlantic Coast Conference football standings
	Conf.					Overall
Team	W		L		T	W		L		T
No. 8 Maryland $	5	–	0	–	0	11	–	1	–	0
North Carolina	4	–	1	–	0	9	–	3	–	0
Wake Forest	3	–	3	–	0	5	–	6	–	0
Duke	2	–	3	–	1	5	–	5	–	1
NC State	2	–	3	–	0	3	–	7	–	1
Virginia	1	–	3	–	0	2	–	9	–	0
Clemson	0	–	4	–	1	3	–	6	–	2
$ – Conference champion; Rankings from AP Poll

The 1976 NC State Wolfpack football team represented North Carolina State University during the 1976 NCAA Division I football season. The Wolfpack were led by first-year head coach Bo Rein and played their home games at Carter Stadium in Raleigh, North Carolina. They competed as members of the Atlantic Coast Conference, finishing in fifth.

== Schedule ==
Date	Opponent	Site	Result	Attendance	Source
September 4	Furman*	Carter Stadium; Raleigh, NC	L 12–17	35,500	
September 11	at Wake Forest	Groves Stadium; Winston-Salem, NC (rivalry)	L 18–20	28,900	
September 18	East Carolina*	Carter Stadium; Raleigh, NC (rivalry)	L 14–23	49,700	
September 25	Michigan State*	Carter Stadium; Raleigh, NC	T 31–31	38,300	
October 2	at Indiana*	Memorial Stadium; Bloomington, IN	W 24–21	32,090	
October 9	No. 7 Maryland	Carter Stadium; Raleigh, NC	L 6–16	38,500	
October 16	at North Carolina	Kenan Memorial Stadium; Chapel Hill, NC (rivalry)	W 21–13	50,000	
October 23	Clemson	Carter Stadium; Raleigh, NC (rivalry)	W 38–21	36,500	
October 30	at South Carolina*	Williams–Brice Stadium; Columbia, SC	L 7–27	50,703	
November 6	at Penn State*	Beaver Stadium; University Park, PA	L 20–41	60,462	
November 13	Duke	Carter Stadium; Raleigh, NC (rivalry)	L 14–28	41,600	
*Non-conference game; Rankings from AP Poll released prior to the game

== Roster ==
1976 NC State Wolfpack football team roster
Players
Coaches
Offense

Pos.	#	Name	Class
RB	23	Ted Brown	So

Defense

Pos.	#	Name	Class
LB	54	Bill Cowher	So
DB	40	Tom London	So

Special teams

Pos.	#	Name	Class
P, QB	10	Johnny Evans	Jr

Head coach

- Bo Rein

Coordinators/assistant coaches

Legend

- (C) Team captain
- (S) Suspended
- (I) Ineligible
- Injured
- Redshirt
