= 1976 Army Cadets football team =

American college football season

1976 Army Cadets football
- Conference: Independent
- Record: 5–6
- Head coach: Homer Smith (3rd season)
- Captain: Jeff Jancek
- Home stadium: Michie Stadium

1976 NCAA Division I independents football records
	Conf.			Overall
Team	W	L	T	W		L		T
No. 1 Pittsburgh		–		12	–	0	–	0
No. 17 Rutgers		–		11	–	0	–	0
San Diego State		–		10	–	1	–	0
No. 12 Notre Dame		–		9	–	3	–	0
Colgate		–		8	–	2	–	0
Boston College		–		8	–	3	–	0
Cincinnati		–		8	–	3	–	0
Memphis State		–		7	–	4	–	0
North Texas State *		–		7	–	4	–	0
Southern Illinois		–		7	–	4	–	0
Penn State		–		7	–	5	–	0
Villanova		–		6	–	4	–	1
South Carolina		–		6	–	5	–	0
Virginia Tech		–		6	–	5	–	0
Army		–		5	–	6	–	0
Florida State		–		5	–	6	–	0
Illinois State		–		5	–	6	–	0
Richmond		–		5	–	6	–	0
West Virginia		–		5	–	6	–	0
Georgia Tech		–		4	–	6	–	1
Temple		–		4	–	6	–	0
Air Force		–		4	–	7	–	0
Dayton		–		4	–	7	–	0
Louisville		–		4	–	7	–	0
Marshall		–		4	–	7	–	0
Navy		–		4	–	7	–	0
Indiana State		–		3	–	7	–	0
Hawaii		–		3	–	8	–	0
Holy Cross		–		3	–	8	–	0
Miami (FL)		–		3	–	8	–	0
Syracuse		–		3	–	8	–	0
Utah State		–		3	–	8	–	0
Northeast Louisiana		–		2	–	9	–	0
Southern Miss		–		2	–	9	–	0
Tulane		–		2	–	9	–	0
North Texas State (originally 6–5) was awarded a forfeit win after Mississippi State was found to be using an ineligible player.; Rankings from AP Poll

The 1976 Army Cadets football team represented the United States Military Academy as an independent during the 1976 NCAA Division I football season. Led by third-year head coach Homer Smith, the Cadets compiled a record of 5–6. THe team played home games at Michie Stadium in West Point, New York.

== Schedule ==
Date	Time	Opponent	Site	Result	Attendance	Source
September 11		Lafayette	Michie Stadium; West Point, NY	W 16–6	20,865	
September 18		Holy Cross	Michie Stadium; West Point, NY	W 26–24	24,176	
September 25		No. 16 North Carolina	Michie Stadium; West Point, NY	L 32–34	24,694	
October 2		Stanford	Michie Stadium; West Point, NY	W 21–20	30,382	
October 9		at Penn State	Beaver Stadium; University Park, PA	L 16–38	60,436	
October 16		at Tulane	Louisiana Superdome; New Orleans, LA	L 10–23	25,327	
October 23		Boston College	Michie Stadium; West Point, NY	L 10–27	32,008	
October 30		Air Force	Michie Stadium; West Point, NY (Commander-in-Chief's Trophy)	W 24–7	42,283	
November 6	1:30 p.m.	at No. 2 Pittsburgh	Pitt Stadium; Pittsburgh, PA	L 7–37	45,753	
November 13		Colgate	Michie Stadium; West Point, NY	W 29–13	29,637	
November 27		vs. Navy	John F. Kennedy Stadium; Philadelphia, PA (Army–Navy Game)	L 10–38	77,612	
Rankings from AP Poll released prior to the game; All times are in Eastern time

== Game summaries ==
=== Stanford ===
Team	1	2	3	4	Total
Stanford	3	7	10	0	20
• Army	0	0	7	14	21

- Date: October 2
- Location: Michie Stadium • West Point, New York

Scoring summary
1	STAN	Michel 27 yard field goal	Stanford 3-0
2	STAN	Lofton 51 yard pass from Cordova (Michel kick)	Stanford 10-0
3	STAN	Michel 52 yard field goal	Stanford 13-0
3	STAN	Mulroy 19 yard pass from Cordova (Michel kick)	Stanford 20-0
3	ARMY	Dwyer 4 yard run (Castelli kick)	Stanford 20-7
4	ARMY	Kuchar 11 yard pass from Hall (kick failed)	Stanford 20-13
4	ARMY	Hall 1 yard run (Brundidge pass from Hall)	Army 21-20

=== Vs. Navy ===
Army Cadets (5–5) vs. Navy Midshipmen (3–7)

Quarter	1	2	3	4	Total
Army	0	10	0	0	10
Navy	7	7	17	7	38

at JFK Stadium, Philadelphia, Pennsylvania

- Date: November 27
- Game weather: Cloudy
- Game attendance: 77,612

Game information

First quarter

- NAVY – Joe Gattuso 2-yard run (Bob Tata kick), 0:15. Navy 7–0. Drive: 51 yards.

Second quarter

- ARMY – Greg King 11-yard run (Mike Castelli kick). Tie 7–7. Drive:
- NAVY – Phil McConkey 11-yard pass from Bob Leszczynski (Bob Tata kick). Navy 14–7. Drive: 57 yards.
- ARMY – Mike Castelli 37-yard field goal. Navy 14–10. Drive:

Third quarter

- NAVY – Joe Gattuso 20-yard run (Bob Tata kick). Navy 21–10. Drive: 75 yards.
- NAVY – Joe Gattuso 1-yard run (Bob Tata kick). Navy 28–10. Drive: 65 yards.
- NAVY – Bob Tata 33-yard field goal. Navy 31–10. Drive:

Fourth quarter

- NAVY – Dave King 16-yard pass from Bob Leszczynski (Bob Tata kick). Navy 38–10. Drive: 30 yards.

Top passers

- ARMY – Leamon Hall – 13/31, 3 INT
- NAVY – Bob Leszczynski – 2 TD

Top rushers

- ARMY
- NAVY – Joe Gattuso – 29 rushes, 128 yards, 3 TD

Top receivers

- ARMY
- NAVY

== Roster ==
1976team=Army Cadets {{{team}}} football team roster
Players
Coaches
Offense

Pos.	#	Name	Class
WR		Don Briggs
TE		Clennie Brundidge	So
OL		Curt Downs
QB		Hank Drought
WR		George Dunaway
RB		Jon Dwyer
QB		Leamon Hall	Jr
OL		Jeff Jancek
OL		Chuck Johnston
RB		Greg King
OL		John Kisiel
TE		Mark Logue
RB		Devon Maness
WR		Greg McGlasker
RB		Jim Merriken
OL		Joe Oliver
RB		Tony Pyne
OL		Kirk Thomas

Defense

Pos.	#	Name	Class
LB		Mark Berry
DL		Ray Beverley
DL		Hal Burton
DB		Dave Charest
LB		Geoff Clark
DL		Chuck D'Amico
DB		Bruce Elliott
DL		Duane Fuller
LB		John Hilliard
DB		Joe LaGasse
DB		Doug Lowery
DB		Phil Macklin
DL	53	Steve Miller	Jr
DB		Carlous Pettus
DL		Chuck Schott
DB		Steve Smith
DB		Wes Sneed
DE		Chip Tenuta

Special teams

Pos.	#	Name	Class
K		Mike Castelli	Jr

Head coach

- Homer Smith

Coordinators/assistant coaches

Legend

- (C) Team captain
- (S) Suspended
- (I) Ineligible
- Injured
- Redshirt
