= 1976 Central Michigan Chippewas football team =

American college football season

1976 Central Michigan Chippewas football
- Conference: Mid-American Conference
- Record: 7–4 (4–3 MAC)
- Head coach: Roy Kramer (10th season)
- Defensive coordinator: Herb Deromedi (8th season)
- MVPs: John Kloc; John Wunderlich
- Home stadium: Perry Shorts Stadium

1976 Mid-American Conference football standings
	Conf.					Overall
Team	W		L		T	W		L		T
Ball State $	4	–	1	–	0	8	–	3	–	0
Kent State	6	–	2	–	0	8	–	4	–	0
Ohio	6	–	2	–	0	7	–	4	–	0
Western Michigan	6	–	3	–	0	7	–	4	–	0
Central Michigan	4	–	3	–	0	7	–	4	–	0
Bowling Green	4	–	3	–	0	6	–	5	–	0
Miami (OH)	2	–	4	–	0	3	–	8	–	0
Toledo	2	–	6	–	0	3	–	8	–	0
Eastern Michigan	1	–	5	–	0	2	–	9	–	0
Northern Illinois	0	–	6	–	0	1	–	10	–	0
$ – Conference champion

The 1976 Central Michigan Chippewas football team represented Central Michigan University in the Mid-American Conference (MAC) during the 1976 NCAA Division I football season. In their tenth season under head coach Roy Kramer, the Chippewas compiled a 7–4 record (4–3 against MAC opponents), finished in a tie for fourth place in the MAC standings, and outscored their opponents, 223 to 219. The team played its home games in Perry Shorts Stadium in Mount Pleasant, Michigan, with attendance of 91,345 in five home games.

The team's statistical leaders included quarterback Ron Rummel with 761 passing yards, running back Mike Gray with 734 rushing yards, and tight end Wayne Schwalbach with 496 receiving yards. Offensive guard John Kloc and defensive tackle John Wunderlich were co-recipients of the team's most valuable player award. Wunderlich, Schwalbach, and defensive back Ed Rykulski received first-team All-MAC honors. Placekicker Rade Savich kicked 14 field goals, a school record that he broke in 1978.

== Schedule ==
Date	Opponent	Site	Result	Attendance	Source
September 11	Kent State	Perry Shorts Stadium; Mount Pleasant, MI	L 10–20		
September 18	Toledo	Perry Shorts Stadium; Mount Pleasant, MI	W 9–7	18,492	
September 25	at Marshall*	Fairfield Stadium; Huntington, WV	W 22–7	13,479	
October 2	Illinois State*	Perry Shorts Stadium; Mount Pleasant, MI	W 26–7		
October 9	Ohio	Perry Shorts Stadium; Mount Pleasant, MI	W 17–15	15,631	
October 16	Indiana State*^{†}	Perry Shorts Stadium; Mount Pleasant, MI	W 16–13	20,265	
October 23	at Northern Michigan*	Memorial Field; Marquette, MI	L 13–41	16,014	
October 30	at Bowling Green	Doyt Perry Stadium; Bowling Green, OH	W 38–28		
November 6	at Eastern Michigan	Rynearson Stadium; Ypsilanti, MI (rivalry)	L 27–30	12,300	
November 13	at Northern Illinois	Huskie Stadium; DeKalb, IL	W 31–9	4,526	
November 20	at Western Michigan	Waldo Stadium; Kalamazoo, MI(rivalry)	L 14–42	13,800	
*Non-conference game; ^{†}Homecoming
