= 1976 Wichita State Shockers football team =

American college football season

1976 Wichita State Shockers football
- Conference: Missouri Valley Conference
- Record: 4–7 (2–2 MVC)
- Head coach: Jim Wright (3rd season)
- Home stadium: Cessna Stadium

1976 Missouri Valley Conference football standings
	Conf.					Overall
Team	W		L		T	W		L		T
Tulsa +	2	–	1	–	1	7	–	4	–	1
New Mexico State +	2	–	1	–	1	4	–	6	–	1
West Texas State	1	–	1	–	2	4	–	5	–	2
Wichita State	2	–	2	–	0	4	–	7	–	0
Drake	1	–	3	–	0	1	–	10	–	0
+ – Conference co-champions

The 1976 Wichita State Shockers football team was an American football team that represented Wichita State as a member of the Missouri Valley Conference (MVC) during the 1976 NCAA Division I football season. In their third year under head coach Jim Wright, the team compiled an overall record of 4–7 with a mark of 2–2 in conference play, tying for third place in the MVC.

== Schedule ==
Date	Opponent	Site	Result	Attendance	Source
September 11	Northern Illinois*	Cessna Stadium; Wichita, KS	W 21–0	27,311	
September 18	at West Texas State	Kimbrough Memorial Stadium; Canyon, TX	L 12–14		
September 25	at Colorado State*	Hughes Stadium; Fort Collins, CO	L 3–24	24,680	
October 2	at Louisville*	Fairgrounds Stadium; Louisville, KY	L 14–28	16,541	
October 9	Fresno State*	Cessna Stadium; Wichita, KS	W 30–24	12,609	
October 16	Drake	Cessna Stadium; Wichita, KS	W 33–23	11,116	
October 23	at Memphis State*	Liberty Bowl Memorial Stadium; Memphis, TN	L 0–31	15,555	
October 30	Long Beach State*	Cessna Stadium; Wichita, KS	L 14–24	8,431	
November 6	at New Mexico State	Memorial Stadium; Las Cruces, NM	L 6–26	12,023	
November 13	Indiana State*	Cessna Stadium; Wichita, KS	L 17–20	3,019	
November 20	at Tulsa	Skelly Stadium; Tulsa, OK	W 30–13	12,425	
*Non-conference game

== Roster ==
1976 Wichita State Shockers football team roster
Players
Coaches
Offense

Pos.	#	Name	Class
QB	5	Sam Adkins	Sr

Defense

Pos.	#	Name	Class
LB		Ron Shumon	Jr
DT	79	Ted Vincent	Jr

Special teams

Pos.	#	Name	Class

Head coach

- Jim Wright

Coordinators/assistant coaches

Legend

- (C) Team captain
- (S) Suspended
- (I) Ineligible
- Injured
- Redshirt
