= 1976 UT Arlington Mavericks football team =

American college football season

1976 UT Arlington Mavericks football
- Conference: Southland Conference
- Record: 5–6 (3–2 Southland)
- Head coach: Harold Elliott (3rd season)
- Home stadium: Arlington Stadium

1976 Southland Conference football standings
	Conf.					Overall
Team	W		L		T	W		L		T
McNeese State $	4	–	1	–	0	10	–	2	–	0
Southwestern Louisiana	4	–	1	–	0	7	–	4	–	0
UT Arlington	3	–	2	–	0	5	–	6	–	0
Louisiana Tech	2	–	3	–	0	6	–	5	–	0
Arkansas State	2	–	3	–	0	5	–	6	–	0
Lamar	0	–	5	–	0	2	–	9	–	0
$ – Conference champion; Southwestern Louisiana forfeited 2 non-conference season wins.

The 1976 UT Arlington Mavericks football team was an American football team that represented the University of Texas at Arlington in the Southland Conference during the 1976 NCAA Division I football season. In their third year under head coach Harold Elliott, the team compiled a 5–6 record.

== Schedule ==
Date	Opponent	Site	Result	Attendance	Source
September 4	at UTEP*	Sun Bowl; El Paso, TX	L 15–38	16,650	
September 11	at North Texas State*	Fouts Field; Denton, TX	L 7–24	14,800	
September 18	New Mexico State*	Arlington Stadium; Arlington, TX	W 21–10	3,100	
September 25	at Northeast Louisiana*	Brown Stadium; Monroe, LA	L 20–21	8,100	
October 2	West Texas State*	Cravens Field; Arlington, TX	W 23–21	7,283	
October 9	Louisiana Tech	Arlington Stadium; Arlington, TX	W 56–35	5,500	
October 16	at McNeese State	Cowboy Stadium; Lake Charles, LA	W 27–10	15,000	
October 30	Southwestern Louisiana	Arlington Stadium; Arlington, TX	L 24–31	7,400	
November 13	Arkansas State	Arlington Stadium; Arlington, TX	L 13–14	2,500	
November 20	at Lamar	Cardinal Stadium; Beaumont, TX	W 34–14	1,800	
November 27	at Southern Miss*	M. M. Roberts Stadium; Hattiesburg, MS	L 10–21	9,665	
*Non-conference game
