= 1976 Northern Illinois Huskies football team =

American college football season

1976 Northern Illinois Huskies football
- Conference: Mid-American Conference
- Record: 1–10 (0–6 MAC)
- Head coach: Pat Culpepper (1st season)
- Offensive coordinator: Jack Dean (2nd season)
- MVPs: Don Palochko; Vince Smith; Tim Dacy
- Captains: Tim Dacy; Tim Miller; Don Palochko; Vince Smith
- Home stadium: Huskie Stadium

1976 Mid-American Conference football standings
	Conf.					Overall
Team	W		L		T	W		L		T
Ball State $	4	–	1	–	0	8	–	3	–	0
Kent State	6	–	2	–	0	8	–	4	–	0
Ohio	6	–	2	–	0	7	–	4	–	0
Western Michigan	6	–	3	–	0	7	–	4	–	0
Central Michigan	4	–	3	–	0	7	–	4	–	0
Bowling Green	4	–	3	–	0	6	–	5	–	0
Miami (OH)	2	–	4	–	0	3	–	8	–	0
Toledo	2	–	6	–	0	3	–	8	–	0
Eastern Michigan	1	–	5	–	0	2	–	9	–	0
Northern Illinois	0	–	6	–	0	1	–	10	–	0
$ – Conference champion

The 1976 Northern Illinois Huskies football team represented Northern Illinois University as a member of the Mid-American Conference (MAC) during 1976 NCAA Division I football season. Led by first-year head coach Pat Culpepper, the Huskies compiled an overall record of 1–10 with a mark of 0–6 in conference play, placing last out of ten teams in the MAC. Northern Illinois played home games at Huskie Stadium in DeKalb, Illinois.

== Schedule ==
Date	Opponent	Site	Result	Attendance	Source
September 11	at Wichita State*	Cessna Stadium; Wichita, KS	L 0–21	27,311	
September 18	Western Michigan	Huskie Stadium; DeKalb, IL	L 6–37	16,000	
September 25	at Long Beach State*	Veterans Memorial Stadium; Long Beach, CA	L 0–37	7,747	
October 9	at Indiana State*	Memorial Stadium; Terre Haute, IN	L 10–28	15,074	
October 16	Illinois State*	Huskie Stadium; DeKalb, IL	W 7–3	15,407	
October 23	at Southern Illinois*	McAndrew Stadium; Carbondale, IL	L 0–54		
October 30	Ball State	Huskie Stadium; DeKalb, IL (rivalry)	L 7–33	15,126	
November 6	at Toledo	Glass Bowl; Toledo, OH	L 2–17	8,127	
November 13	Central Michigan	Huskie Stadium; DeKalb, IL	L 9–31	4,526	
November 20	at Ohio	Peden Stadium; Athens, OH	L 15–63	7,900	
November 25	at Kent State	Dix Stadium; Kent, OH	L 0–42	3,382	
*Non-conference game
