= Jim Brakefield =

American sports coach (1918–2002)

Biographical details
- Born: October 23, 1918; Quinton, Alabama U.S.
- Died: October 14, 2002 (aged 83); Louisville, Kentucky U.S.

Playing career

Football
- 1940: Centre

Coaching career (HC unless noted)

Football
- 1950–1952: Emory and Henry (assistant)
- 1953–1966: Wofford (assistant)
- 1967–1970: Wofford
- 1971–1979: Appalachian State

Baseball
- 1954–1967: Wofford

Head coaching record
- Overall: 75–64–4 (football)
- Tournaments: Football; 1—1 (NAIA D-I playoffs)

James Andrew Brakefield (October 23, 1918 – October 14, 2002) was an American football and baseball coach. He served as the head football coach at Wofford College in Spartanburg, South Carolina from 1967 to 1970 and at Appalachian State University in Boone, North Carolina from 1971 to 1979, compiling a career college football record of 75–64–4. Brakefield was also the head baseball coach at Wofford from 1954 to 1967. He was an assistant football coach for 17 seasons under Conley Snidow at Emory and Henry College in Emory, Virginia and at Wofford.

== Head coaching record ==
=== Football ===
Year	Team	Overall	Conference	Standing	Bowl/playoffs
Wofford Terriers (NAIA / NAIA Division I independent) (1967–1970)
1967	Wofford	4–6			
1968	Wofford	4–7			
1969	Wofford	9–2			
1970	Wofford	11–1			L NAIA Division I Championship
Wofford:		28–16			
Appalachian State Mountaineers (NCAA College Division independent) (1971)
1971	Appalachian State	7–3–1			
Appalachian State Mountaineers (Southern Conference) (1972–1979)
1972	Appalachian State	5–5–1	0–3–1	8th	
1973	Appalachian State	3–7–1	2–2	5th	
1974	Appalachian State	6–5	4–1	2nd	
1975	Appalachian State	8–3	3–2	3rd	
1976	Appalachian State	6–4–1	2–2–1	3rd	
1977	Appalachian State	2–9	1–4	6th	
1978	Appalachian State	7–4	4–2	3rd	
1979	Appalachian State	3–8	3–4	5th	
Appalachian State:		47–48–4	19–20–2		
Total:		75–64–4			
