= 1976 Illinois State Redbirds football team =

American college football season

1976 Illinois State Redbirds football
- Conference: Independent
- Record: 5–6
- Head coach: Gerry Hart (5th season)
- Home stadium: Hancock Stadium

1976 NCAA Division I independents football records
	Conf.			Overall
Team	W	L	T	W		L		T
No. 1 Pittsburgh		–		12	–	0	–	0
No. 17 Rutgers		–		11	–	0	–	0
San Diego State		–		10	–	1	–	0
No. 12 Notre Dame		–		9	–	3	–	0
Colgate		–		8	–	2	–	0
Boston College		–		8	–	3	–	0
Cincinnati		–		8	–	3	–	0
Memphis State		–		7	–	4	–	0
North Texas State *		–		7	–	4	–	0
Southern Illinois		–		7	–	4	–	0
Penn State		–		7	–	5	–	0
Villanova		–		6	–	4	–	1
South Carolina		–		6	–	5	–	0
Virginia Tech		–		6	–	5	–	0
Army		–		5	–	6	–	0
Florida State		–		5	–	6	–	0
Illinois State		–		5	–	6	–	0
Richmond		–		5	–	6	–	0
West Virginia		–		5	–	6	–	0
Georgia Tech		–		4	–	6	–	1
Temple		–		4	–	6	–	0
Air Force		–		4	–	7	–	0
Dayton		–		4	–	7	–	0
Louisville		–		4	–	7	–	0
Marshall		–		4	–	7	–	0
Navy		–		4	–	7	–	0
Indiana State		–		3	–	7	–	0
Hawaii		–		3	–	8	–	0
Holy Cross		–		3	–	8	–	0
Miami (FL)		–		3	–	8	–	0
Syracuse		–		3	–	8	–	0
Utah State		–		3	–	8	–	0
Northeast Louisiana		–		2	–	9	–	0
Southern Miss		–		2	–	9	–	0
Tulane		–		2	–	9	–	0
North Texas State (originally 6–5) was awarded a forfeit win after Mississippi State was found to be using an ineligible player.; Rankings from AP Poll

The 1976 Illinois State Redbirds football team represented Illinois State University as an independent during the 1976 NCAA Division I football season. In their fifth season under head coach Gerry Hart, the Redbirds compiled a 5–6 record.

== Schedule ==
Date	Opponent	Site	Result	Attendance	Source
September 11	Chattanooga	Hancock Stadium; Normal, IL	L 0–24	10,500	
September 18	Marshall	Hancock Stadium; Normal, IL	L 13–23	7,000	
September 25	at Villanova	Villanova Stadium; Villanova, PA	W 19–17	7,000	
October 2	at Central Michigan	Perry Shorts Stadium; Mount Pleasant, MI	L 7–26		
October 9	Ball State	Hancock Stadium; Normal, IL	W 10–7	12,000	
October 16	at Northern Illinois	Huskie Stadium; DeKalb, IL	L 3–7	15,407	
October 23	Indiana State	Hancock Stadium; Normal, IL	W 24–14	7,500	
October 30	at Western Illinois	Hanson Field; Macomb, IL	L 14–24	6,480	
November 6	at Southern Illinois	McAndrew Stadium; Carbondale, IL	L 3–17	11,750	
November 13	Eastern Michigan	Hancock Stadium; Normal, IL	W 14–6	4,000	
November 20	at Eastern Illinois	O'Brien Stadium; Charleston, IL (rivalry)	W 13–8	4,500	
