= 1976 Richmond Spiders football team =

American college football season

1976 Richmond Spiders football
- Conference: Independent
- Record: 5–6
- Head coach: Jim Tait (3rd season)
- Captains: Gary Edwards; Doug McGee
- Home stadium: City Stadium

1976 NCAA Division I independents football records
	Conf.			Overall
Team	W	L	T	W		L		T
No. 1 Pittsburgh		–		12	–	0	–	0
No. 17 Rutgers		–		11	–	0	–	0
San Diego State		–		10	–	1	–	0
No. 12 Notre Dame		–		9	–	3	–	0
Colgate		–		8	–	2	–	0
Boston College		–		8	–	3	–	0
Cincinnati		–		8	–	3	–	0
Memphis State		–		7	–	4	–	0
North Texas State *		–		7	–	4	–	0
Southern Illinois		–		7	–	4	–	0
Penn State		–		7	–	5	–	0
Villanova		–		6	–	4	–	1
South Carolina		–		6	–	5	–	0
Virginia Tech		–		6	–	5	–	0
Army		–		5	–	6	–	0
Florida State		–		5	–	6	–	0
Illinois State		–		5	–	6	–	0
Richmond		–		5	–	6	–	0
West Virginia		–		5	–	6	–	0
Georgia Tech		–		4	–	6	–	1
Temple		–		4	–	6	–	0
Air Force		–		4	–	7	–	0
Dayton		–		4	–	7	–	0
Louisville		–		4	–	7	–	0
Marshall		–		4	–	7	–	0
Navy		–		4	–	7	–	0
Indiana State		–		3	–	7	–	0
Hawaii		–		3	–	8	–	0
Holy Cross		–		3	–	8	–	0
Miami (FL)		–		3	–	8	–	0
Syracuse		–		3	–	8	–	0
Utah State		–		3	–	8	–	0
Northeast Louisiana		–		2	–	9	–	0
Southern Miss		–		2	–	9	–	0
Tulane		–		2	–	9	–	0
North Texas State (originally 6–5) was awarded a forfeit win after Mississippi State was found to be using an ineligible player.; Rankings from AP Poll

The 1976 Richmond Spiders football team was an American football team that represented the University of Richmond as an independent during the 1976 NCAA Division I football season. In their third season under head coach Jim Tait, Richmond compiled a 5–6 record.

== Schedule ==
Date	Opponent	Site	Result	Attendance	Source
September 4	at Tulsa	Skelly Stadium; Tulsa, OK	L 7–22	24,000	
September 11	at No. 12 Maryland	Byrd Stadium; College Park, MD	L 7–31	41,088	
September 25	VMI	City Stadium; Richmond, VA (rivalry)	W 43–0	11,500	
October 2	at West Virginia	Mountaineer Field; Morgantown, WV	L 6–9	30,437	
October 9	at Villanova	Villanova Stadium; Villanova, PA	W 24–7	6,500	
October 16	at The Citadel	Johnson Hagood Stadium; Charleston, SC	L 7–20	16,745	
October 23	at Furman	Sirrine Stadium; Greenville, SC	W 13–9	8,000	
October 30	Chattanooga	City Stadium; Richmond, VA	L 19–28	12,200	
November 6	East Carolina	City Stadium; Richmond, VA	L 10–20	15,500	
November 13	Virginia Tech	City Stadium; Richmond, VA	W 16–0	20,200	
November 20	William & Mary	City Stadium; Richmond, VA (rivalry)	W 21–10	18,500	
Rankings from AP Poll released prior to the game
