= 1976 Wake Forest Demon Deacons football team =

American college football season

1976 Wake Forest Demon Deacons football
- Conference: Atlantic Coast Conference
- Record: 5–6 (3–3 ACC)
- Head coach: Chuck Mills (4th season)
- Captain: Bill Armstrong
- Home stadium: Groves Stadium

1976 Atlantic Coast Conference football standings
	Conf.					Overall
Team	W		L		T	W		L		T
No. 8 Maryland $	5	–	0	–	0	11	–	1	–	0
North Carolina	4	–	1	–	0	9	–	3	–	0
Wake Forest	3	–	3	–	0	5	–	6	–	0
Duke	2	–	3	–	1	5	–	5	–	1
NC State	2	–	3	–	0	3	–	7	–	1
Virginia	1	–	3	–	0	2	–	9	–	0
Clemson	0	–	4	–	1	3	–	6	–	2
$ – Conference champion; Rankings from AP Poll

The 1976 Wake Forest Demon Deacons football team was an American football team that represented Wake Forest University during the 1976 NCAA Division I football season. In their fourth season under head coach Chuck Mills, the Demon Deacons compiled a 5–6 record and finished in third place in the Atlantic Coast Conference.

== Schedule ==
Date	Opponent	Site	Result	Attendance	Source
September 4	Virginia Tech*	Groves Stadium; Winston-Salem, NC	L 6–23	25,600	
September 11	NC State	Groves Stadium; Winston-Salem, NC (rivalry)	W 20–18	28,900	
September 18	at Vanderbilt*	Dudley Field; Nashville, TN	L 24–27	21,900	
September 25	at Kansas State*	KSU Stadium; Manhattan, KS	W 13–0	25,500	
October 2	at No. 1 Michigan*	Michigan Stadium; Ann Arbor, MI	L 0–31	103,241	
October 9	Clemson	Groves Stadium; Winston-Salem, NC	W 20–14	18,000	
October 16	at No. 5 Maryland	Byrd Stadium; College Park, MD	L 15–17	46,321	
October 23	Virginia	Groves Stadium; Winston-Salem, NC	L 17–18	18,300	
October 30	North Carolina	Groves Stadium; Winston-Salem, NC (rivalry)	L 14–34	30,150	
November 6	at Duke	Wallace Wade Stadium; Durham, NC (rivalry)	W 38–17	23,600	
November 13	at No. 20 South Carolina*	Williams–Brice Stadium; Columbia, SC	W 10–7	49,773	
*Non-conference game; Rankings from AP Poll released prior to the game

== Team leaders ==
Category	Team Leader	Att/Cth	Yds
Passing	Mike McGlamrey	91/183	1,066
Rushing	James McDougald	232	1,018
Receiving	Steve Young	36	414
