= 1976 Davidson Wildcats football team =

American college football season

1976 Davidson Wildcats football
- Conference: Southern Conference
- Record: 2–6–1 (0–0 SoCon)
- Head coach: Ed Farrell (3rd season)
- Home stadium: Richardson Stadium

1976 Southern Conference football standings
| | Conf. | | | | | Overall |
| Team | W | | L | | T | W | | L | | T |
|---|---|---|---|---|---|---|---|---|---|---|
| East Carolina $ | 4 | – | 1 | – | 0 | 9 | – | 2 | – | 0 |
| William & Mary | 3 | – | 2 | – | 0 | 7 | – | 4 | – | 0 |
| Appalachian State | 2 | – | 2 | – | 1 | 6 | – | 4 | – | 1 |
| Furman | 2 | – | 2 | – | 1 | 6 | – | 4 | – | 1 |
| VMI | 2 | – | 3 | – | 0 | 5 | – | 5 | – | 0 |
| The Citadel | 1 | – | 4 | – | 0 | 6 | – | 5 | – | 0 |
| Davidson | 0 | – | 0 | – | 0 | 2 | – | 6 | – | 1 |
$ – Conference champion

The 1976 Davidson Wildcats football team represented Davidson College as a member of the Southern Conference during the 1976 NCAA Division I football season. Led by third-year head coach Ed Farrell, the Wildcats compiled an overall record of 2–6–1.

== Schedule ==
| Date | Opponent | Site | Result | Attendance | Source |
|---|---|---|---|---|---|
| September 18 | Colgate* | Richardson Stadium; Davidson, NC | L 7–17 | 3,500 | |
| September 25 | Bucknell* | Richardson Stadium; Davidson, NC | L 0–16 | 3,500 | |
| October 9 | at Randolph–Macon* | Day Field; Ashland, VA | T 0–0 | 1,800 | |
| October 16 | Madison* | Richardson Stadium; Davidson, NC | L 12–17 | | |
| October 23 | at Hampden–Sydney* | Hampden-Sydney, VA | W 20–14 | | |
| October 30 | at Guilford* | Greensboro, NC | W 27–6 | 3,000 | |
| November 6 | at Delaware* | Delaware Stadium; Newark, DE | L 0–63 | 16,130 | |
| November 13 | Lafayette* | Richardson Stadium; Davidson, NC | L 20–30 | 1,000–2,000 | |
| November 20 | at The Citadel* | Johnson Hagood Stadium; Charleston, SC | L 6–40 | 15,785 | |
*Non-conference game
