= 1976 Western Michigan Broncos football team =

American college football season

1976 Western Michigan Broncos football
- Conference: Mid-American Conference
- Record: 7–4 (6–3 MAC)
- Head coach: Elliot Uzelac (2nd season)
- MVP: Jerome Persell
- Captains: Dave Gapinski; Pepper Powers
- Home stadium: Waldo Stadium

1976 Mid-American Conference football standings
| | Conf. | | | | | Overall |
| Team | W | | L | | T | W | | L | | T |
|---|---|---|---|---|---|---|---|---|---|---|
| Ball State $ | 4 | – | 1 | – | 0 | 8 | – | 3 | – | 0 |
| Kent State | 6 | – | 2 | – | 0 | 8 | – | 4 | – | 0 |
| Ohio | 6 | – | 2 | – | 0 | 7 | – | 4 | – | 0 |
| Western Michigan | 6 | – | 3 | – | 0 | 7 | – | 4 | – | 0 |
| Central Michigan | 4 | – | 3 | – | 0 | 7 | – | 4 | – | 0 |
| Bowling Green | 4 | – | 3 | – | 0 | 6 | – | 5 | – | 0 |
| Miami (OH) | 2 | – | 4 | – | 0 | 3 | – | 8 | – | 0 |
| Toledo | 2 | – | 6 | – | 0 | 3 | – | 8 | – | 0 |
| Eastern Michigan | 1 | – | 5 | – | 0 | 2 | – | 9 | – | 0 |
| Northern Illinois | 0 | – | 6 | – | 0 | 1 | – | 10 | – | 0 |
$ – Conference champion

The 1976 Western Michigan Broncos football team represented Western Michigan University in the Mid-American Conference (MAC) during the 1976 NCAA Division I football season. In their second season under head coach Elliot Uzelac, the Broncos compiled a 7–4 record (6–3 against MAC opponents), finished in fourth place in the MAC, and outscored their opponents, 270 to 202. The team played its home games at Waldo Stadium in Kalamazoo, Michigan.

The team's statistical leaders included Pepper Powers with 571 passing yards, Jerome Persell with 1,505 rushing yards, and Tom Henry with 225 receiving yards. Defensive back Dave Gapinski and quarterback Pepper Powers were the team captains. Tailback Jerome Persell received the team's most outstanding player award.

Persell was also named MAC offensive player of the year for the first of what would be three consecutive years. Elliot Uzelac was named the MAC coach of the year.

== Schedule ==
| Date | Opponent | Site | Result | Attendance | Source |
|---|---|---|---|---|---|
| September 11 | Eastern Michigan | Waldo Stadium; Kalamazoo, MI | W 31–13 | 19,200 | |
| September 18 | at Northern Illinois | Huskie Stadium; DeKalb, IL | W 37–6 | 16,000 | |
| September 25 | at Minnesota* | Memorial Stadium; Minneapolis, MN | L 10–21 | 33,229 | |
| October 2 | Bowling Green | Waldo Stadium; Kalamazoo, MI | L 0–28 | 19,500 | |
| October 9 | at Kent State | Dix Stadium; Kent, OH | L 12–24 | 5,468 | |
| October 16 | Toledo | Waldo Stadium; Kalamazoo, MI | W 34–21 | | |
| October 23 | Marshall* | Waldo Stadium; Kalamazoo, MI | W 31–21 | | |
| October 30 | Ohio | Waldo Stadium; Kalamazoo, MI | W 21–20 | 15,800 | |
| November 6 | at Miami (OH) | Miami Field; Oxford, OH | L 0–31 | 14,644 | |
| November 13 | at Ball State | Ball State Stadium; Muncie, IN | W 24–10 | 10,257 | |
| November 20 | Central Michigan | Waldo Stadium; Kalamazoo, MI (rivalry) | W 42–14 | 13,800 | |
*Non-conference game
