= 1976 VMI Keydets football team =

American college football season

1976 VMI Keydets football
- Conference: Southern Conference
- Record: 5–5 (2–3 SoCon)
- Head coach: Bob Thalman (6th season)
- Home stadium: Alumni Memorial Field

1976 Southern Conference football standings
	Conf.					Overall
Team	W		L		T	W		L		T
East Carolina $	4	–	1	–	0	9	–	2	–	0
William & Mary	3	–	2	–	0	7	–	4	–	0
Appalachian State	2	–	2	–	1	6	–	4	–	1
Furman	2	–	2	–	1	6	–	4	–	1
VMI	2	–	3	–	0	5	–	5	–	0
The Citadel	1	–	4	–	0	6	–	5	–	0
Davidson	0	–	0	–	0	2	–	6	–	1
$ – Conference champion

The 1976 VMI Keydets football team was an American football team that represented the Virginia Military Institute (VMI) as a member of the Southern Conference (SoCon) during the 1976 NCAA Division I football season. In their sixth year under head coach Bob Thalman, the team compiled an overall record of 5–5 with a mark of 2–3 in conference play, placing fifth in the SoCon.

== Schedule ==
Date	Opponent	Site	Result	Attendance	Source
September 11	at William & Mary	Cary Field; Williamsburg, VA (rivalry)	L 20–34	11,200	
September 18	Appalachian State	Alumni Memorial Field; Lexington, VA	L 12–31	6,600	
September 25	at Richmond*	City Stadium; Richmond, VA (rivalry)	L 0–43	11,500	
October 2	Furman	Alumni Memorial Field; Lexington, VA	W 17–3	3,100	
October 9	vs. Virginia Tech*	City Stadium; Richmond, VA (Tobacco Bowl, rivalry)	L 7–37	21,000	
October 16	East Carolina	Alumni Memorial Field; Lexington, VA	L 3–17	7,700	
October 23	at Delaware*	Delaware Stadium; Newark, DE	W 10–6	21,134	
October 30	vs. Virginia*	Foreman Field; Norfolk, VA (Oyster Bowl)	W 13–7	22,500	
November 6	at The Citadel	Johnson Hagood Stadium; Charleston, SC (rivalry)	W 30–14	18,745	
November 20	Indiana State*	Alumni Memorial Field; Lexington, VA	W 26–14	5,300	
*Non-conference game
