= Jimmy Redmond =

American football player (born 1977)

No. 87, 17, 19
- Positions: Wide receiver, special teamer

Personal information
- Born: August 18, 1977 (age 49); Kansas City, Missouri, U.S.
- Listed height: 6 ft 0 in (1.83 m)
- Listed weight: 190 lb (86 kg)

Career information
- High school: Blue Springs South (MO)
- College: Ohio State, McNeese State
- NFL draft: 2001: undrafted

Career history
- Tennessee Titans (2001)*; Jacksonville Jaguars (2001-2004); Frankfurt Galaxy (2002); Minnesota Vikings (2006)*
- * Offseason or practice squad member only

Awards and highlights
- H.S State Long jump champion; Blue Springs South H.S long jump record; All Southland Conference-McNeese St.; 2002 Official All-NFLE

Career NFL statistics
- Games played: 46
- Tackles: 42
- Targets: 7
- Receptions: 3
- Receiving yards: 67
- Returns-Return yards: 2-53
- Stats at Pro Football Reference

James Lewis Redmond III (born August 18, 1977) is an American former professional football player who was a wide receiver and special teamer for four seasons with the Jacksonville Jaguarsin the National Football League (NFL). He played college football for the Ohio State Buckeyes and McNeese State Cowboys. He also spent time in the NFL with the Tennessee Titans and Minnesota Vikings, as well as the Frankfurt Galaxy of NFL Europe.

== Early life ==
Jimmy Redmond was born on August 18, 1977, in Kansas City, Missouri. He grew up as a Chiefs fan. He went to Blue Springs South (MO) high school.

== College ==
Redmond was a 5-star recruit in two sports, Track, and American football. He signed a scholarship offer to attend college at Ohio State University. During his time at Ohio State, he made 4 major bowl appearances. He was a 2x letter winner, Rose Bowl champion, and Sugar Bowl champion along with being a 4x Big Ten conference champion amassing a 43-7 record with his Buckeye football team. After two season-ending football injuries, 1997 against Wyoming University and 1998 against West Virginia, Redmond transferred to McNeese State University. Redmond did not pursue track at McNeese State University. He helped guide McNeese State football to the first round of the D1-AA football playoffs against Georgia Southern University, where he had 4 catches for 112 yards and 1 touchdown. He was in college from 1995 to 2001 and graduated with a Bachelor of Science degree.

== Professional career ==
Pre-draft measurables
Height	Weight	40-yard dash
6 ft 0 in (1.83 m)	195 lb (88 kg)	4.33 s
All values from NFL Scouting Combine

Tennessee Titans

Redmond was signed by the Tennessee Titans as an undrafted free agent following the 2001 NFL draft but he did not make the roster.

Jacksonville Jaguars

He was signed by the Jacksonville Jaguars to the practice squad on December 12, 2001. He was re-signed in January 2002. In 2001 he did not play in any games. In 2002 he played in 14 games, but he was only used on special teams. Redmond wore number 87 in 2002. He had 11 tackles in 2002. On March 24, 2003, he was re-signed again. He was released on August 31, 2003, but signed again on September 9. On September 28, 2003, against the Houston Texans, Redmond made a hit on JJ Moses which drew a penalty and a 5,000 dollar fine. During 2003 he played in 12 games. He had 11 tackles and he had 3 receptions for 67 yards. Jimmy wore number 17 with the Jaguars in 2003. In March 2004 he was signed to a one-year contract but he did not make the final roster.

Frankfurt Galaxy

During the 2002 offseason, Redmond played for the Frankfurt Galaxy in NFL Europe. He was also named to the All-NFL Europe team in 2002.

Minnesota Vikings

After not playing in 2004 or in 2005, he was signed by the Minnesota Vikings, but released 2 months later. After being released by the Vikings, he did not play another NFL game.

== Later life ==
Redmond is currently an Independent Consultant at Beehive Athletics.
