= 1976 Furman Paladins football team =

American college football season

1976 Furman Paladins football
- Conference: Southern Conference
- Record: 6–4–1 (2–2–1 SoCon)
- Head coach: Art Baker (4th season)
- Captains: David Whitehurst; Tommy Marshall; Larry Anderson
- Home stadium: Sirrine Stadium

1976 Southern Conference football standings
	Conf.					Overall
Team	W		L		T	W		L		T
East Carolina $	4	–	1	–	0	9	–	2	–	0
William & Mary	3	–	2	–	0	7	–	4	–	0
Appalachian State	2	–	2	–	1	6	–	4	–	1
Furman	2	–	2	–	1	6	–	4	–	1
VMI	2	–	3	–	0	5	–	5	–	0
The Citadel	1	–	4	–	0	6	–	5	–	0
Davidson	0	–	0	–	0	2	–	6	–	1
$ – Conference champion

The 1976 Furman Paladins football team was an American football team that represented Furman University as a member of the Southern Conference (SoCon) during the 1976 NCAA Division I football season. In their fourth season under head coach Art Baker, Furman compiled a 6–4–1 record, with a mark of 2–2–1 in conference play, placing tied for third in the SoCon.

== Schedule ==
Date	Opponent	Site	Result	Attendance	Source
September 4	at NC State*	Carter Stadium; Raleigh, NC	W 17–12	35,500	
September 11	at Tennessee Tech*	Overhill Stadium; Cookeville, TN	W 17–7	11,000	
September 18	Presbyterian*	Sirrine Stadium; Greenville, SC	W 38–21	16,000	
September 25	The Citadel	Sirrine Stadium; Greenville, SC (rivalry)	L 16–17	17,200	
October 2	at VMI	Alumni Memorial Field; Lexington, VA	L 3–17	3,100	
October 9	at Appalachian State	Conrad Stadium; Boone, NC	T 14–14	8,240	
October 16	at Southwestern Louisiana*	Cajun Field; Lafayette, LA	L 16–27		
October 23	Richmond*	Sirrine Stadium; Greenville, SC	L 9–13	8,000	
October 30	William & Mary	Sirrine Stadium; Greenville, SC	W 23–7	7,000	
November 13	East Carolina	Sirrine Stadium; Greenville, SC	W 17–10	13,600	
November 20	Wofford*	Sirrine Stadium; Greenville, SC (rivalry)	W 56–14	4,500	
*Non-conference game

== Roster ==
1976 Furman Paladins football team roster
Players			Coaches
Offense: Pos. / # / Name / Class; QB / 11 / David Whitehurst / Sr	Defense: Pos. / # / Name / Class; DE / / Steve Patton / Sr	Special teams: Pos. / # / Name / Class	Head coach: Art Baker; Coordinators/assistant coaches Legend: (C) Team captain; (S) Suspended; (I) Ineligible; Injured; Redshirt
