= 1976 Southern Miss Golden Eagles football team =

American college football season

1976 Southern Miss Golden Eagles football
- Conference: Independent
- Record: 3–8
- Head coach: Bobby Collins (2nd season)
- Home stadium: M. M. Roberts Stadium

1976 NCAA Division I independents football records
	Conf.			Overall
Team	W	L	T	W		L		T
No. 1 Pittsburgh		–		12	–	0	–	0
No. 17 Rutgers		–		11	–	0	–	0
San Diego State		–		10	–	1	–	0
No. 12 Notre Dame		–		9	–	3	–	0
Colgate		–		8	–	2	–	0
Boston College		–		8	–	3	–	0
Cincinnati		–		8	–	3	–	0
Memphis State		–		7	–	4	–	0
North Texas State *		–		7	–	4	–	0
Southern Illinois		–		7	–	4	–	0
Penn State		–		7	–	5	–	0
Villanova		–		6	–	4	–	1
South Carolina		–		6	–	5	–	0
Virginia Tech		–		6	–	5	–	0
Army		–		5	–	6	–	0
Florida State		–		5	–	6	–	0
Illinois State		–		5	–	6	–	0
Richmond		–		5	–	6	–	0
West Virginia		–		5	–	6	–	0
Georgia Tech		–		4	–	6	–	1
Temple		–		4	–	6	–	0
Air Force		–		4	–	7	–	0
Dayton		–		4	–	7	–	0
Louisville		–		4	–	7	–	0
Marshall		–		4	–	7	–	0
Navy		–		4	–	7	–	0
Indiana State		–		3	–	7	–	0
Hawaii		–		3	–	8	–	0
Holy Cross		–		3	–	8	–	0
Miami (FL)		–		3	–	8	–	0
Syracuse		–		3	–	8	–	0
Utah State		–		3	–	8	–	0
Northeast Louisiana		–		2	–	9	–	0
Southern Miss		–		2	–	9	–	0
Tulane		–		2	–	9	–	0
North Texas State (originally 6–5) was awarded a forfeit win after Mississippi State was found to be using an ineligible player.; Rankings from AP Poll

The 1976 Southern Miss Golden Eagles football team was an American football team that represented the University of Southern Mississippi as an independent during the 1976 NCAA Division I football season. In their second year under head coach Bobby Collins, the team compiled a 3–8 record.

== Schedule ==
Date	Opponent	Site	Result	Attendance	Source
September 11	at East Carolina	Ficklen Memorial Stadium; Greenville, NC	L 0–48	17,400	
September 18	at Virginia Tech	Lane Stadium; Blacksburg, VA	L 7–16	35,000	
September 25	No. 17 Ole Miss	M. M. Roberts Stadium; Hattiesburg, MS	L 0–28	33,000	
October 2	Cincinnati	M. M. Roberts Stadium; Hattiesburg, MS	L 21–28	13,500	
October 9	at Alabama	Legion Field; Birmingham, AL	L 8–24	42,202	
October 16	at BYU	Cougar Stadium; Provo, UT	L 19–63	23,029	
October 23	No. 20 Mississippi State^{†}	M. M. Roberts Stadium; Hattiesburg, MS	W 6–14 (forfeit)	31,225	
November 6	at Florida State	Doak Campbell Stadium; Tallahassee, FL	L 27–30	29,173	
November 13	at Louisiana Tech	Joe Aillet Stadium; Ruston, LA (rivalry)	L 22–23	11,258	
November 20	Memphis State	M. M. Roberts Stadium; Hattiesburg, MS	W 14–12	12,154	
November 27	UT Arlington	M. M. Roberts Stadium; Hattiesburg, MS	W 21–10	9,665	
^{†}Homecoming; Rankings from AP Poll released prior to the game
