= 1976 Arkansas State Indians football team =

American college football season

1976 Arkansas State Indians football
- Conference: Southland Conference
- Record: 5–6 (2–3 Southland)
- Head coach: Bill Davidson (6th season)
- Home stadium: Indian Stadium

1976 Southland Conference football standings
	Conf.					Overall
Team	W		L		T	W		L		T
McNeese State $	4	–	1	–	0	10	–	2	–	0
Southwestern Louisiana	4	–	1	–	0	7	–	4	–	0
UT Arlington	3	–	2	–	0	5	–	6	–	0
Louisiana Tech	2	–	3	–	0	6	–	5	–	0
Arkansas State	2	–	3	–	0	5	–	6	–	0
Lamar	0	–	5	–	0	2	–	9	–	0
$ – Conference champion; Southwestern Louisiana forfeited 2 non-conference season wins.

The 1976 Arkansas State Indians football team represented Arkansas State University as a member of the Southland Conference during the 1976 NCAA Division I football season. Led by sixth-year head coach Bill Davidson, the Indians compiled an overall record of 5–6 with a mark of 2–3 in conference, tying for fourth place in the Southland.

== Schedule ==
Date	Opponent	Site	Result	Attendance	Source
September 4	Northeast Louisiana*	Indian Stadium; Jonesboro, AR	W 31–13		
September 12	at San Diego State*	San Diego Stadium; San Diego, CA	L 14–24	36,791	
September 18	at Indiana State*	Memorial Stadium; Terre Haute, IN	L 21–31		
September 25	Louisiana Tech	Indian Stadium; Jonesboro, AR	L 13–27	16,022	
October 2	Northwestern State*	Indian Stadium; Jonesboro, AR	W 44–24	12,715	
October 9	at Eastern Michigan*	Rynearson Stadium; Ypsilanti, MI	L 30–32		
October 16	at Southern Illinois*	McAndrew Stadium; Carbondale, IL	W 41–10	6,200	
October 23	McNeese State	Indian Stadium; Jonesboro, AR	L 21–24		
October 30	Lamar^{†}	Indian Stadium; Jonesboro, AR	W 31–0	7,000	
November 6	at Southwestern Louisiana	Cajun Field; Lafayette, LA	L 14–23	30,176	
November 13	at UT Arlington	Arlington Stadium; Arlington, TX	W 14–13	2,500	
*Non-conference game; ^{†}Homecoming
