= 1976 Kent State Golden Flashes football team =

American college football season

1976 Kent State Golden Flashes football
- Conference: Mid-American Conference
- Record: 8–4 (6–2 MAC)
- Head coach: Dennis Fitzgerald (2nd season)
- Home stadium: Dix Stadium

1976 Mid-American Conference football standings
	Conf.					Overall
Team	W		L		T	W		L		T
Ball State $	4	–	1	–	0	8	–	3	–	0
Kent State	6	–	2	–	0	8	–	4	–	0
Ohio	6	–	2	–	0	7	–	4	–	0
Western Michigan	6	–	3	–	0	7	–	4	–	0
Central Michigan	4	–	3	–	0	7	–	4	–	0
Bowling Green	4	–	3	–	0	6	–	5	–	0
Miami (OH)	2	–	4	–	0	3	–	8	–	0
Toledo	2	–	6	–	0	3	–	8	–	0
Eastern Michigan	1	–	5	–	0	2	–	9	–	0
Northern Illinois	0	–	6	–	0	1	–	10	–	0
$ – Conference champion

The 1976 Kent State Golden Flashes was an American football team that represented Kent State University in the Mid-American Conference (MAC) during the 1976 NCAA Division I football season.

Their statistical leaders included Art Best with 1,030 rushing yards, Mike Whaylen with 822 passing yards, and Kim Featsent with 415 receiving yards. Five Kent State players were selected as first-team All-MAC players: wide receiver Kim Featsent, offensive tackle Tom Jesko, linebacker Jack Lazor, placekicker Paul Marchese, and defensive lineman Mike Zele.

== Schedule ==
Date	Opponent	Site	Result	Attendance	Source
September 11	at Central Michigan	Perry Shorts Stadium; Mount Pleasant, MI	W 20–10		
September 18	Ohio	Dix Stadium; Kent, OH	L 12–14	11,300	
September 25	at Iowa State*	Cyclone Stadium; Ames, IA	L 7–47	37,000	
October 2	vs. Air Force*	Municipal Stadium; Cleveland, OH	W 24–19	8,176	
October 9	Western Michigan	Dix Stadium; Kent, OH	W 24–12	5,468	
October 16	at Bowling Green	Doyt Perry Stadium; Bowling Green, OH (rivalry)	L 13–17	15,263	
October 23	at Virginia Tech*	Lane Stadium; Blacksburg, VA	L 14–42	37,000	
October 30	Eastern Michigan^{†}	Dix Stadium; Kent, OH	W 38–13	6,224	
November 6	at Hawaii*	Aloha Stadium; Halawa, HI	W 27–6	17,447	
November 13	at Miami (OH)	Miami Field; Oxford, OH	W 24–17	6,525	
November 20	Toledo	Dix Stadium; Kent, OH	W 35–9	3,636	
November 25	Northern Illinois	Dix Stadium; Kent, OH	W 42–0	3,382	
*Non-conference game; ^{†}Homecoming

== Roster ==
1976 Kent State Golden Flashes football team roster
Players
Coaches
Offense

Pos.	#	Name	Class
RB	23	Art Best	Sr

Defense

Pos.	#	Name	Class
LB	89	Mike McKibben	So
DT	81	Mike Zele	So

Special teams

Pos.	#	Name	Class

Head coach

- Earle Bruce

Coordinators/assistant coaches

Legend

- (C) Team captain
- (S) Suspended
- (I) Ineligible
- Injured
- Redshirt
