= 1976 Toledo Rockets football team =

American college football season

1976 Toledo Rockets football
- Conference: Mid-American Conference
- Record: 3–8 (2–6 MAC)
- Head coach: Jack Murphy (6th season)
- Defensive coordinator: Dan Simrell (4th season)
- Home stadium: Glass Bowl

1976 Mid-American Conference football standings
	Conf.					Overall
Team	W		L		T	W		L		T
Ball State $	4	–	1	–	0	8	–	3	–	0
Kent State	6	–	2	–	0	8	–	4	–	0
Ohio	6	–	2	–	0	7	–	4	–	0
Western Michigan	6	–	3	–	0	7	–	4	–	0
Central Michigan	4	–	3	–	0	7	–	4	–	0
Bowling Green	4	–	3	–	0	6	–	5	–	0
Miami (OH)	2	–	4	–	0	3	–	8	–	0
Toledo	2	–	6	–	0	3	–	8	–	0
Eastern Michigan	1	–	5	–	0	2	–	9	–	0
Northern Illinois	0	–	6	–	0	1	–	10	–	0
$ – Conference champion

The 1976 Toledo Rockets football team was an American football team that represented the University of Toledo in the Mid-American Conference (MAC) during the 1976 NCAA Division I football season. In their sixth and final season under head coach Jack Murphy, the Rockets compiled a 3–8 record (2–6 against MAC opponents), finished in a tie for seventh place in the MAC, and were outscored by all opponents by a combined total of 232 to 185.

The team's statistical leaders included Jeff Hepinstall with 1,299 passing yards, Skip McCulley with 578 rushing yards, and Scott Resseguie with 530 receiving yards.

== Schedule ==
Date	Opponent	Site	Result	Attendance	Source
September 11	at UMass*	Alumni Stadium; Hadley, MA	L 14–28	9,500	
September 18	at Central Michigan	Perry Shorts Stadium; Mount Pleasant, MI	L 7–9	18,492	
September 25	Ball State	Glass Bowl; Toledo, OH	L 14–27	15,235	
October 2	at Ohio	Peden Stadium; Athens, OH	L 8–34	10,937	
October 9	Bowling Green	Glass Bowl; Toledo, OH (rivalry)	L 28–29	16,180	
October 16	at Western Michigan	Waldo Stadium; Kalamazoo, MI	L 21–34		
October 23	at Dayton*	Welcome Stadium; Dayton, OH	L 14–17		
October 30	Miami (OH)	Glass Bowl; Toledo, OH	W 24–9	12,098	
November 6	Northern Illinois	Glass Bowl; Toledo, OH	W 17–2	8,127	
November 13	Marshall*	Glass Bowl; Toledo, OH	W 29–8	7,289	
November 20	at Kent State	Dix Stadium; Kent, OH	L 9–35	3,636	
*Non-conference game
