= 1976 West Texas State Buffaloes football team =

American college football season

1976 West Texas State Buffaloes football
- Conference: Missouri Valley Conference
- Record: 4–5–2 (1–1–2 MVC)
- Head coach: Gene Mayfield (6th season)
- Home stadium: Kimbrough Memorial Stadium

1976 Missouri Valley Conference football standings
	Conf.					Overall
Team	W		L		T	W		L		T
Tulsa +	2	–	1	–	1	7	–	4	–	1
New Mexico State +	2	–	1	–	1	4	–	6	–	1
West Texas State	1	–	1	–	2	4	–	5	–	2
Wichita State	2	–	2	–	0	4	–	7	–	0
Drake	1	–	3	–	0	1	–	10	–	0
+ – Conference co-champions

The 1976 West Texas State Buffaloes football team was an American football team that represented West Texas State University (now known as West Texas A&M University) as a member of the Missouri Valley Conference (MVC) during the 1976 NCAA Division I football season. In their sixth year under head coach Gene Mayfield, the Buffaloes compiled an overall record of 4–5–2 with a mark of 1–1–2 in conference play, tying for third place in the MVC.

== Schedule ==
Date	Opponent	Site	Result	Attendance	Source
September 18	Wichita State	Kimbrough Memorial Stadium; Canyon, TX	W 14–12		
September 25	at Southern Illinois*	McAndrew Stadium; Carbondale, IL	L 17–21		
October 2	at UT Arlington*	Cravens Field; Arlington, TX	L 21–23	7,283	
October 9	at Houston*	Houston Astrodome; Houston, TX	L 7–50	23,498	
October 16	North Texas State*	Kimbrough Memorial Stadium; Canyon, TX	L 7–10	10,500	
October 23	at Drake	Drake Stadium; Des Moines, IA	L 14–34	8,116	
October 30	McNeese State*	Kimbrough Memorial Stadium; Canyon, TX	W 30–25	5,000	
November 6	Lamar*	Kimbrough Memorial Stadium; Canyon, TX	W 21–6	3,500	
November 13	Northeast Louisiana*	Kimbrough Memorial Stadium; Canyon, TX	W 58–41		
November 20	at New Mexico State	Memorial Stadium; Las Cruces, NM	T 13–13	6,376	
November 27	at Tulsa	Skelly Stadium; Tulsa, OK	T 17–17	7,137	
*Non-conference game
