= 1976 New Mexico State Aggies football team =

American college football season

1976 New Mexico State Aggies football

MVC co-champion
- Conference: Missouri Valley Conference
- Record: 4–6–1 (2–1–1 MVC)
- Head coach: Jim Bradley (4th season)
- Home stadium: Memorial Stadium

1976 Missouri Valley Conference football standings
	Conf.					Overall
Team	W		L		T	W		L		T
Tulsa +	2	–	1	–	1	7	–	4	–	1
New Mexico State +	2	–	1	–	1	4	–	6	–	1
West Texas State	1	–	1	–	2	4	–	5	–	2
Wichita State	2	–	2	–	0	4	–	7	–	0
Drake	1	–	3	–	0	1	–	10	–	0
+ – Conference co-champions

The 1976 New Mexico State Aggies football team was an American football team that represented New Mexico State University in the Missouri Valley Conference during the 1976 NCAA Division I football season. In their fourth year under head coach Jim Bradley, the Aggies compiled a 4–6–1 record. The team played home games at Memorial Stadium in Las Cruces, New Mexico.

== Schedule ==
Date	Opponent	Site	Result	Attendance	Source
September 4	at Drake	Drake Stadium; Des Moines, IA	W 30–29	12,630	
September 11	UTEP*	Memorial Stadium; Las Cruces, NM (rivalry)	W 13–10	13,155	
September 18	at UT Arlington*	Arlington Stadium; Arlington, TX	L 10–21		
September 25	Lamar*	Memorial Stadium; Las Cruces, NM	L 17–21		
October 2	at Tulsa	Skelly Stadium; Tulsa, OK	L 7–32	31,700	
October 9	at Idaho*	Kibbie Dome; Moscow, ID	L 6–33	10,166	
October 23	North Texas State	Memorial Stadium; Las Cruces, NM	L 14–25	8,369	
October 30	at New Mexico*	University Stadium; Albuquerque, NM (rivalry)	W 16–7	23,236	
November 6	Wichita State	Memorial Stadium; Las Cruces, NM	W 26–6	12,023	
November 13	at Fresno State*	Ratcliffe Stadium; Fresno, CA	L 0–44	8,279	
November 20	West Texas State	Memorial Stadium; Las Cruces, NM	T 13–13	6,376	
*Non-conference game
