= 1976 Drake Bulldogs football team =

American college football season

1976 Drake Bulldogs football
- Conference: Missouri Valley Conference
- Record: 1–10 (1–3 MVC)
- Head coach: Jack Wallace (12th season)
- Home stadium: Drake Stadium

1976 Missouri Valley Conference football standings
	Conf.					Overall
Team	W		L		T	W		L		T
Tulsa +	2	–	1	–	1	7	–	4	–	1
New Mexico State +	2	–	1	–	1	4	–	6	–	1
West Texas State	1	–	1	–	2	4	–	5	–	2
Wichita State	2	–	2	–	0	4	–	7	–	0
Drake	1	–	3	–	0	1	–	10	–	0
+ – Conference co-champions

The 1976 Drake Bulldogs football team represented the Drake University as a member of the Missouri Valley Conference (MVC) during the 1976 NCAA Division I football season. Led by Jack Wallace in his 12th and final season has head coach, the Bulldogs compiled an overall record of 1–10 with a mark of 1–3 in conference play, placing last out of five teams in the MVC. Drake played home games at Drake Stadium in Des Moines, Iowa.

== Schedule ==
Date	Opponent	Site	Result	Attendance	Source
September 4	New Mexico State	Drake Stadium; Des Moines, IA	L 29–30	12,630	
September 11	at Iowa State*	Cyclone Stadium; Ames, IA	L 14–58	41,000	
September 18	Southern Illinois*	Drake Stadium; Des Moines, IA	L 15–27	12,332	
September 25	at Louisville*	Fairgrounds Stadium; Louisville, KY	L 24–37	16,009	
October 2	at Colorado*	Folsom Field; Boulder, CO	L 24–45	45,318	
October 9	at Long Beach State*	Veterans Memorial Stadium; Long Beach, CA	L 10–41	10,200	
October 16	at Wichita State	Cessna Stadium; Wichita, KS	L 23–33	11,116	
October 23	West Texas State	Drake Stadium; Des Moines, IA	W 34–14	8,116	
November 6	Temple*	Drake Stadium; Des Moines, IA	L 7–31	7,245	
November 13	Tulsa	Drake Stadium; Des Moines, IA	L 20–45	5,182	
November 20	at North Texas State*	Fouts Field; Denton, TX	L 0–63	6,100	
*Non-conference game

== Roster ==
1976 Drake Bulldogs football team roster
Players
Coaches
Offense

Pos.	#	Name	Class
QB	19	Dan Dodd	Jr
QB	16	Jeff Martin	Sr
OT	74	Jack Matia	So

Defense

Pos.	#	Name	Class
DB	30	Kelly Ford	Sr
DE	94	Jeff Koerten	Sr
DE	28	Doug Siedenburg	Sr
LB	56	Dan Zarazan	Sr

Special teams

Pos.	#	Name	Class

Head coach

- Jack Wallace

Coordinators/assistant coaches

Legend

- (C) Team captain
- (S) Suspended
- (I) Ineligible
- Injured
- Redshirt
