= 1976 Miami Redskins football team =

American college football season

1976 Miami Redskins football
- Conference: Mid-American Conference
- Record: 3–8 (2–4 MAC)
- Head coach: Dick Crum (3rd season)
- Defensive coordinator: Joe Novak (3rd season)
- Home stadium: Miami Field

1976 Mid-American Conference football standings
	Conf.					Overall
Team	W		L		T	W		L		T
Ball State $	4	–	1	–	0	8	–	3	–	0
Kent State	6	–	2	–	0	8	–	4	–	0
Ohio	6	–	2	–	0	7	–	4	–	0
Western Michigan	6	–	3	–	0	7	–	4	–	0
Central Michigan	4	–	3	–	0	7	–	4	–	0
Bowling Green	4	–	3	–	0	6	–	5	–	0
Miami (OH)	2	–	4	–	0	3	–	8	–	0
Toledo	2	–	6	–	0	3	–	8	–	0
Eastern Michigan	1	–	5	–	0	2	–	9	–	0
Northern Illinois	0	–	6	–	0	1	–	10	–	0
$ – Conference champion

The 1976 Miami Redskins football team was an American football team that represented Miami University in the Mid-American Conference (MAC) during the 1976 NCAA Division I football season. In their third season under head coach Dick Crum, Miami finished in seventh place in the MAC with a 3–8 record (2–4 against MAC opponents) and were outscored by all opponents by a combined total of 208 to 160.

The team's statistical leaders included Larry Fortner with 1,219 passing yards and 1,002 rushing yards, Rob Carpenter with 1,064 rushing yards, and Steve Joecken with 404 receiving yards.

== Schedule ==
Date	Opponent	Rank	Site	Result	Attendance	Source
September 4	at North Carolina*	No. 20	Kenan Memorial Stadium; Chapel Hill, NC	L 10–14	34,000	
September 11	at Marshall*	No. 20	Fairfield Stadium; Huntington, WV	L 16–21	11,732	
September 18	Ball State		Miami Field; Oxford, OH	L 6–23	16,151	
September 25	at Cincinnati*		Nippert Stadium; Cincinnati, OH (rivalry)	L 0–17	24,562	
October 2	at Purdue*		Ross–Ade Stadium; West Lafayette, IN	L 20–42	55,102	
October 16	at Ohio		Peden Stadium; Athens, OH (rivalry)	L 14–28	15,100	
October 23	Bowling Green		Miami Field; Oxford, OH	W 9–7	15,081	
October 30	at Toledo		Glass Bowl; Toledo, OH	L 9–24	12,098	
November 6	Western Michigan		Miami Field; Oxford, OH	W 31–0	14,644	
November 13	Kent State		Miami Field; Oxford, OH	L 17–24	6,525	
November 20	Dayton*		Miami Field; Oxford, OH	W 28–8		
*Non-conference game; Rankings from AP Poll released prior to the game
