= 1971 Grantland Rice Bowl =

| Tennessee State Tigers | McNeese State Cowboys |
| (8–1) | (9–0–1) |
| Independent | Independent |
| 26 | 23 |
| Head coach: John Merritt | Head coach: Jack Doland |
| | 1 | 2 | 3 | 4 | Total |
|---|---|---|---|---|---|
| Tennessee State | 0 | 6 | 13 | 7 | 26 |
| McNeese State | 0 | 16 | 7 | 0 | 23 |
- Date: December 11, 1971
- Season: 1971
- Stadium: BREC Memorial Stadium
- Location: Baton Rouge, Louisiana
- Attendance: 15,271

The 1971 Grantland Rice Bowl was an NCAA College Division game following the 1971 season, between the Tennessee State Tigers and the McNeese State Cowboys.

== Notable participants ==
From Tennessee State, three players were selected in the 1972 NFL draft – defensive back Clifford Brooks, linebacker Robert Stevenson, and quarterback Joe Gilliam. Players later selected in the 1973 NFL draft include tackle Robert Woods, tight end Jim Thaxton, wide receiver Ollie Smith, defensive end Will Wynn, and wide receiver Charlie Wade. Sophomore defensive end Ed "Too Tall" Jones would be the number one pick in the 1974 NFL draft.

From McNeese State, guard Mike O'Quinn was selected in the 1972 NFL Draft. Running back Larry Grissom was inducted to his university's hall of fame in 1985, as was safety Billy Blakeman in 2009. Quarterback Greg Davis went on to be the head coach at Tulane, and offensive coordinator for several college teams.

Tennessee State head coach John Merritt was inducted to the College Football Hall of Fame in 1994. McNeese State head coach Jack Doland was inducted to the Louisiana Sports Hall of Fame in 2002.

== Scoring summary ==
Scoring summary

| Quarter | Time | Drive | | | Team | Scoring information | Score | |
| Quarter | Time | Plays | Yards | TOP | Team | Scoring information | TSU | MSU |
|---|---|---|---|---|---|---|---|---|
| 2 | 12:30 | 8 | 67 | | MSU | Spencer Thomas recovered offensive fumble in the TSU end zone, Larry Grissom kick good | 0 | 7 |
| 2 | 6:21 | | | | TSU | Clifford Brooks recovered fumbled punt attempt in the MSU end zone, Alfred Reese kick failed | 6 | 7 |
| 2 | 2:40 | 3 | 25 | | MSU | Robert Rowe 20-yard touchdown reception from Greg Davis, Larry Grissom kick failed (blocked) | 6 | 13 |
| 2 | 0:06 | 8 | 42 | | MSU | 40-yard field goal by Larry Grissom | 6 | 16 |
| 3 | 12:20 | 6 | 78 | | TSU | John Holland 8-yard touchdown reception from Joe Gilliam, Alfred Reese kick good | 13 | 16 |
| 3 | | 3 | 14 | | TSU | John Holland 17-yard touchdown reception from Joe Gilliam, Alfred Reese kick failed | 19 | 16 |
| 3 | 7:45 | 9 | 71 | | MSU | James Moore 5-yard touchdown reception from Allen Dennis, Larry Grissom kick good | 19 | 23 |
| 4 | 14:54 | 5 | 66 | | TSU | Ollie Smith 45-yard touchdown reception from Joe Gilliam, Alfred Reese kick good | 26 | 23 |
| "TOP" = time of possession. For other American football terms, see Glossary of American football. | | | | | | | 26 | 23 |

†Grissom's field goal was the first in Grantland Rice Bowl history.
