= 1976 Ohio Bobcats football team =

American college football season

1976 Ohio Bobcats football
- Conference: Mid-American Conference
- Record: 7–4 (6–2 MAC)
- Head coach: Bill Hess (19th season)
- Home stadium: Peden Stadium

1976 Mid-American Conference football standings
	Conf.					Overall
Team	W		L		T	W		L		T
Ball State $	4	–	1	–	0	8	–	3	–	0
Kent State	6	–	2	–	0	8	–	4	–	0
Ohio	6	–	2	–	0	7	–	4	–	0
Western Michigan	6	–	3	–	0	7	–	4	–	0
Central Michigan	4	–	3	–	0	7	–	4	–	0
Bowling Green	4	–	3	–	0	6	–	5	–	0
Miami (OH)	2	–	4	–	0	3	–	8	–	0
Toledo	2	–	6	–	0	3	–	8	–	0
Eastern Michigan	1	–	5	–	0	2	–	9	–	0
Northern Illinois	0	–	6	–	0	1	–	10	–	0
$ – Conference champion

The 1976 Ohio Bobcats football team was an American football team that represented Ohio University in the Mid-American Conference (MAC) during the 1976 NCAA Division I football season. In their 19th season under head coach Bill Hess, the Bobcats compiled a 7–4 record (6–2 against MAC opponents), finished in a tie for third place in the MAC, and outscored all opponents by a combined total of 253 to 175. They played their home games in Peden Stadium in Athens, Ohio.

The team's statistical leaders included Andy Vetter with 877 passing yards, Arnold Welcher with 1,034 rushing yards, and Phil Buckner with 226 receiving yards.

== Schedule ==
Date	Opponent	Site	Result	Attendance	Source
September 4	at Eastern Michigan	Rynearson Stadium; Ypsilanti, MI	W 23–7	11,200	
September 18	at Kent State	Dix Stadium; Kent, OH	W 14–12	11,300	
September 25	Idaho*	Peden Stadium; Athens, OH	W 35–0	13,710	
October 2	Toledo	Peden Stadium; Athens, OH	W 34–8	10,937	
October 9	at Central Michigan	Perry Shorts Stadium; Mount Pleasant, MI	L 15–17	15,631	
October 16	Miami (OH)	Peden Stadium; Athens, OH (rivalry)	W 28–14	15,100	
October 23	William & Mary*	Peden Stadium; Athens, OH	L 0–20	13,650	
October 30	at Western Michigan	Waldo Stadium; Kalamazoo, MI	L 10–21	15,800	
November 6	at Bowling Green	Doyt Perry Stadium; Bowling Green, OH	W 31–26	13,469	
November 13	at Cincinnati*	Nippert Stadium; Cincinnati, OH	L 0–35		
November 20	Northern Illinois	Peden Stadium; Athens, OH	W 63–15	7,900	
*Non-conference game
