= 1976 Southern Illinois Salukis football team =

American college football season

1976 Southern Illinois Salukis football
- Conference: Independent
- Record: 7–4
- Head coach: Rey Dempsey (1st season)
- Home stadium: McAndrew Stadium

1976 NCAA Division I independents football records
	Conf.			Overall
Team	W	L	T	W		L		T
No. 1 Pittsburgh		–		12	–	0	–	0
No. 17 Rutgers		–		11	–	0	–	0
San Diego State		–		10	–	1	–	0
No. 12 Notre Dame		–		9	–	3	–	0
Colgate		–		8	–	2	–	0
Boston College		–		8	–	3	–	0
Cincinnati		–		8	–	3	–	0
Memphis State		–		7	–	4	–	0
North Texas State *		–		7	–	4	–	0
Southern Illinois		–		7	–	4	–	0
Penn State		–		7	–	5	–	0
Villanova		–		6	–	4	–	1
South Carolina		–		6	–	5	–	0
Virginia Tech		–		6	–	5	–	0
Army		–		5	–	6	–	0
Florida State		–		5	–	6	–	0
Illinois State		–		5	–	6	–	0
Richmond		–		5	–	6	–	0
West Virginia		–		5	–	6	–	0
Georgia Tech		–		4	–	6	–	1
Temple		–		4	–	6	–	0
Air Force		–		4	–	7	–	0
Dayton		–		4	–	7	–	0
Louisville		–		4	–	7	–	0
Marshall		–		4	–	7	–	0
Navy		–		4	–	7	–	0
Indiana State		–		3	–	7	–	0
Hawaii		–		3	–	8	–	0
Holy Cross		–		3	–	8	–	0
Miami (FL)		–		3	–	8	–	0
Syracuse		–		3	–	8	–	0
Utah State		–		3	–	8	–	0
Northeast Louisiana		–		2	–	9	–	0
Southern Miss		–		2	–	9	–	0
Tulane		–		2	–	9	–	0
North Texas State (originally 6–5) was awarded a forfeit win after Mississippi State was found to be using an ineligible player.; Rankings from AP Poll

The 1976 Southern Illinois Salukis football team was an American football team that represented Southern Illinois University (now known as Southern Illinois University Carbondale) as an independent during the 1976 NCAA Division I football season. Under first-year head coach Rey Dempsey, the team compiled a 7–4 record. The team played its home games at McAndrew Stadium in Carbondale, Illinois.

== Schedule ==
Date	Opponent	Site	Result	Attendance	Source
September 11	at McNeese State	Cowboy Stadium; Lake Charles, LA	L 0–38	15,000	
September 18	at Drake	Drake Stadium; Des Moines, IA	W 27–15	12,332	
September 25	West Texas State	McAndrew Stadium; Carbondale, IL	W 21–7		
October 2	Lamar	McAndrew Stadium; Carbondale, IL	W 19–7	12,750	
October 9	at East Carolina	Ficklen Memorial Stadium; Greenville, NC	L 14–49	16,200	
October 16	Arkansas State	McAndrew Stadium; Carbondale, IL	L 10–41	6,200	
October 23	Northern Illinois	McAndrew Stadium; Carbondale, IL	W 54–0		
October 30	at Indiana State	Memorial Stadium; Terre Haute, IN	W 21–2	3,200	
November 6	Illinois State	McAndrew Stadium; Carbondale, IL	W 17–3	11,750	
November 13	at Bowling Green	Doyt Perry Stadium; Bowling Green, OH	L 7–35		
November 20	at Marshall	Fairfield Stadium; Huntington, WV	W 44–16	10,835	
