= 1976 Independence Bowl =

| Tulsa Golden Hurricane | McNeese State Cowboys |
| (7–3–1) | (9–2) |
| Missouri Valley Conference | Southland Conference |
| 16 | 20 |
| Head coach: F. A. Dry | Head coach: Jack Doland |
| | 1 | 2 | 3 | 4 | Total |
|---|---|---|---|---|---|
| Tulsa | 7 | 0 | 6 | 3 | 16 |
| McNeese State | 3 | 3 | 8 | 6 | 20 |
- Date: December 13, 1976
- Season: 1976
- Stadium: State Fair Stadium
- Location: Shreveport, Louisiana
- MVP: Terry McFarland (offense); Terry Clark (defense)
- Attendance: 19,164

The 1976 Independence Bowl was a post-season college football bowl game between the Tulsa Golden Hurricane and the McNeese State Cowboys on December 13, 1976, at State Fair Stadium in Shreveport, Louisiana. McNeese State upset a heavily favored Tulsa 20–16. This was the first-ever edition of the Independence Bowl, which drew its name from the ongoing celebrations of the United States Bicentennial.

== Background ==
Between 1976–1980 the Independence Bowl featured the Southland Conference champion against an at-large opponent, with the Southland team playing host. McNeese State clinched the championship and spot in the bowl game after defeating Southwestern Louisiana 20–19 on November 20. For the at-large opponent the bowl organizers initially pursued Rutgers, which was then 10–0 and would finish the season undefeated. Rutgers declined the invitation, feeling snubbed by more prestigious bowls. Rebuffed, the organizers considered Tulsa, Cincinnati, Memphis State, Boston College, and Ball State before selecting Tulsa, co-champion of the Missouri Valley Conference.

Prior to the game, coverage favored Tulsa over McNeese State due in large part to sixteen of McNeese State's players being unable to play in the bowl. Ten players were declared ineligible because they had redshirted in their freshman year and were thus fifth-year seniors. At the time, NCAA rules prohibited such players from participating in postseason play. Six more players were suspended from the team for violating team and school rules. The players were accused of having a girl in their dormitory room, which McNeese State then prohibited. Some newspaper accounts alleged that "sexual molestation" had occurred. Even before the game was played F. A. Dry, Tulsa's head coach, had accepted the head coaching job at TCU, though he stayed on at Tulsa for the bowl game.

== Scoring summary ==
Scoring summary

| Quarter | Time | Drive | | | Team | Scoring information | Score | |
| Quarter | Time | Plays | Yards | TOP | Team | Scoring information | Golden Hurricane | Cowboys |
|---|---|---|---|---|---|---|---|---|
| 1 | | | | | Golden Hurricane | Thomas Bailey 1-yard touchdown run, Steve Cox kick good | 7 | 0 |
| 1 | | | | | Cowboys | 42-yard field goal by Jan Peebles | 7 | 3 |
| 2 | | | | | Cowboys | 34-yard field goal by Jan Peebles | 7 | 6 |
| 3 | | | | | Cowboys | Mike McArthur 1-yard touchdown run, 2-point run good | 7 | 14 |
| 3 | | | | | Golden Hurricane | Mel McGowen 65-yard blocked field goal returned for touchdown, kick no good (blocked) | 13 | 14 |
| 4 | | | | | Golden Hurricane | 38-yard field goal by Steve Cox | 16 | 14 |
| 4 | | | | | Cowboys | Oliver Hadnot 25-yard touchdown run, 2-point pass incomplete | 16 | 20 |
| "TOP" = time of possession. For other American football terms, see Glossary of American football. | | | | | | | 16 | 20 |
