= 1976 Southwestern Louisiana Ragin' Cajuns football team =

American college football season

1976 Southwestern Louisiana Ragin' Cajuns football
- Conference: Southland Conference
- Record: 7–4, 2 wins forfeited (4–1 Southland)
- Head coach: Augie Tammariello (3rd season)
- Home stadium: Cajun Field

1976 Southland Conference football standings
	Conf.					Overall
Team	W		L		T	W		L		T
McNeese State $	4	–	1	–	0	10	–	2	–	0
Southwestern Louisiana	4	–	1	–	0	7	–	4	–	0
UT Arlington	3	–	2	–	0	5	–	6	–	0
Louisiana Tech	2	–	3	–	0	6	–	5	–	0
Arkansas State	2	–	3	–	0	5	–	6	–	0
Lamar	0	–	5	–	0	2	–	9	–	0
$ – Conference champion; Southwestern Louisiana forfeited 2 non-conference season wins.

The 1976 Southwestern Louisiana Ragin' Cajuns football team was an American football team that represented the University of Southwestern Louisiana (now known as the University of Louisiana at Lafayette) in the Southland Conference during the 1976 NCAA Division I football season. In their third year under head coach Augie Tammariello, the team compiled a 7–4 record. The Conference forfeited their victories over Fresno State and Cincinnati later in the season after they determined two ineligible players were on the Cajuns roster.

== Schedule ==
Date	Opponent	Site	Result	Attendance	Source
September 11	Fresno State*	Cajun Field; Lafayette, LA	W 41–14 (forfeit)	22,890	
September 18	Cincinnati*	Cajun Field; Lafayette, LA	W 7–3 (forfeit)		
October 2	Louisiana Tech	Cajun Field; Lafayette, LA (rivalry)	W 31–26	26,640	
October 9	at Lamar	Cardinal Stadium; Beaumont, TX (Sabine Shoe)	W 34–9		
October 16	Furman*	Cajun Field; Lafayette, LA	W 27–16		
October 23	Pacific (CA)*	Cajun Field; Lafayette, LA	W 38–10		
October 30	at UT Arlington	Arlington Stadium; Arlington, TX	W 31–24	7,400	
November 6	Arkansas State	Cajun Field; Lafayette, LA	W 23–14	30,176	
November 13	at Northwestern State*	Harry Turpin Stadium; Natchitoches, LA	L 3–7	1,500	
November 20	at McNeese State	Cowboy Stadium; Lake Charles, LA (rivalry)	L 19–20		
December 4	Northeast Louisiana*	Cajun Field; Lafayette, LA (rivalry)	W 7–5	19,315	
*Non-conference game
