= 1976 Lamar Cardinals football team =

American college football season

1976 Lamar Cardinals football
- Conference: Southland Conference
- Record: 2–9 (0–5 Southland)
- Head coach: Bob Frederick (1st season)
- Home stadium: Cardinal Stadium

1976 Southland Conference football standings
	Conf.					Overall
Team	W		L		T	W		L		T
McNeese State $	4	–	1	–	0	10	–	2	–	0
Southwestern Louisiana	4	–	1	–	0	7	–	4	–	0
UT Arlington	3	–	2	–	0	5	–	6	–	0
Louisiana Tech	2	–	3	–	0	6	–	5	–	0
Arkansas State	2	–	3	–	0	5	–	6	–	0
Lamar	0	–	5	–	0	2	–	9	–	0
$ – Conference champion; Southwestern Louisiana forfeited 2 non-conference season wins.

The 1976 Lamar Cardinals football team represented Lamar University as a member of the Southland Conference during the 1976 NCAA Division I football season. Led by first-year head coach Bob Frederick, the Cardinals compiled an overall record of 2–9 with a mark of 0–5 in conference play, placing last out of six teams in the Southland. Lamar played home games at Cardinal Stadium in Beaumont, Texas.

== Schedule ==
Date	Opponent	Site	Result	Attendance	Source
September 11	Northwestern State*	Cardinal Stadium; Beaumont, TX	W 17–6		
September 18	at Northeast Louisiana*	Brown Stadium; Monroe, LA	L 6–16		
September 25	at New Mexico State*	Memorial Stadium; Las Cruces, NM	W 21–17		
October 2	at Southern Illinois*	McAndrew Stadium; Carbondale, IL	L 7–19	12,750	
October 9	at Southwestern Louisiana	Cardinal Stadium; Beaumont, TX (rivalry)	L 9–34		
October 16	at Louisiana Tech	Joe Aillet Stadium; Ruston, LA	L 7–37	12,327	
October 23	Long Beach State*	Cardinal Stadium; Beaumont, TX	L 10–21	7,098	
October 30	at Arkansas State	Indian Stadium; Jonesboro, AR	L 0–31	7,000	
November 6	at West Texas State*	Kimbrough Memorial Stadium; Canyon, TX	L 6–21	3,500	
November 13	McNeese State	Cardinal Stadium; Beaumont, TX (Battle of the Border)	L 0–27		
November 20	UT Arlington	Cardinal Stadium; Beaumont, TX	L 14–34	1,800	
*Non-conference game
