= Jim Wright (American football coach) =

American football player and coach (1935–2025)

Biographical details
- Born: December 24, 1935; Edinburg, Texas, U.S.
- Died: January 26, 2025 (aged 89)

Playing career
- 1954–1957: Texas A&M
- Position: Quarterback

Coaching career (HC unless noted)
- 1961–1966: Texas Tech (assistant)
- 1967–1969: Mississippi State (assistant)
- 1970–1973: Tennessee (assistant)
- 1974–1978: Wichita State

Head coaching record
- Overall: 17–37–1

James "Jim" Wright Jr. (December 24, 1935 – January 26, 2025) was an American football player and coach. He served as the head football coach at Wichita State University from 1974 to 1978, compiling a record of 17–37–1. Wright was born on December 12, 1935, in Edinburg, Texas. He played college football as a quarterback at Texas A&M University from 1954 to 1957. Prior to becoming head coach at Wichita State, Wright worked as an assistant football coach at Texas Tech University from 1961 to 1966, at Mississippi State University from 1967 to 1969, and at the University of Tennessee from 1970 to 1973.

== Head coaching record ==
Year	Team	Overall	Conference	Standing	Bowl/playoffs
Wichita State Shockers (Missouri Valley Conference) (1974–1978)
1974	Wichita State	1–9–1	1–4–1	7th	
1975	Wichita State	3–8	1–3	T–4th	
1976	Wichita State	4–7	2–2	T–3rd	
1977	Wichita State	5–6	3–1	2nd	
1978	Wichita State	4–7	2–4	6th	
Wichita State:		17–37–1	9–14–1		
Total:		17–37–1			

== Death ==
Wright died on January 26, 2025, at the age of 89.
