= 1976 Louisiana Tech Bulldogs football team =

American college football season

1976 Louisiana Tech Bulldogs football
- Conference: Southland Conference
- Record: 6–5 (2–3 Southland)
- Head coach: Maxie Lambright (10th season)
- Captains: Steve Haynes; Mike Thompson
- Home stadium: Joe Aillet Stadium

1976 Southland Conference football standings
	Conf.					Overall
Team	W		L		T	W		L		T
McNeese State $	4	–	1	–	0	10	–	2	–	0
Southwestern Louisiana	4	–	1	–	0	7	–	4	–	0
UT Arlington	3	–	2	–	0	5	–	6	–	0
Louisiana Tech	2	–	3	–	0	6	–	5	–	0
Arkansas State	2	–	3	–	0	5	–	6	–	0
Lamar	0	–	5	–	0	2	–	9	–	0
$ – Conference champion; Southwestern Louisiana forfeited 2 non-conference season wins.

The 1976 Louisiana Tech Bulldogs football team was an American football team that represented Louisiana Tech University as a member of the Southland Conference during the 1976 NCAA Division I football season. In their tenth year under head coach Maxie Lambright, the team compiled a 6–5 record.

== Schedule ==
Date	Opponent	Site	Result	Attendance	Source
September 11	at Ball State*	Ball State Stadium; Muncie, IN	L 28–41	16,172	
September 18	McNeese State	Joe Aillet Stadium; Ruston, LA	L 13–15	17,734	
September 25	at Arkansas State	Indian Stadium; Jonesboro, AR	W 27–13	16,022	
October 2	at Southwestern Louisiana	Cajun Field; Lafayette, LA (rivalry)	L 26–31	26,640	
October 9	at UT Arlington	Arlington Stadium; Arlington, TX	L 35–56	5,500	
October 16	Lamar	Joe Aillet Stadium; Ruston, LA	W 37–7	12,327	
October 23	vs. Northwestern State*	State Fair Stadium; Shreveport, LA (rivalry)	W 35–6	24,200	
October 30	vs. North Texas State*	State Fair Stadium; Shreveport, LA	L 8–14	6,532	
November 6	at Chattanooga*	Chamberlain Field; Chattanooga, TN	W 49–7		
November 13	Southern Miss*	Joe Aillet Stadium; Ruston, LA (rivalry)	W 23–22	11,258	
November 20	at Northeast Louisiana*	Brown Stadium; Monroe, LA (rivalry)	W 55–35		
*Non-conference game
