= 1976 North Carolina Tar Heels football team =

American college football season

1976 North Carolina Tar Heels football

Peach Bowl, L 0–21 vs. Kentucky
- Conference: Atlantic Coast Conference
- Record: 9–3 (4–1 ACC)
- Head coach: Bill Dooley (10th season)
- Offensive coordinator: Pat Watson (1st season)
- Defensive coordinator: Jim Dickey (2nd season)
- Captains: Craig Funk; Ronny Johnson
- Home stadium: Kenan Memorial Stadium

1976 Atlantic Coast Conference football standings
	Conf.					Overall
Team	W		L		T	W		L		T
No. 8 Maryland $	5	–	0	–	0	11	–	1	–	0
North Carolina	4	–	1	–	0	9	–	3	–	0
Wake Forest	3	–	3	–	0	5	–	6	–	0
Duke	2	–	3	–	1	5	–	5	–	1
NC State	2	–	3	–	0	3	–	7	–	1
Virginia	1	–	3	–	0	2	–	9	–	0
Clemson	0	–	4	–	1	3	–	6	–	2
$ – Conference champion; Rankings from AP Poll

The 1976 North Carolina Tar Heels football team represented the University of North Carolina at Chapel Hill during the 1976 NCAA Division I football season. The Tar Heels were led by tenth-year head coach Bill Dooley and played their home games at Kenan Memorial Stadium in Chapel Hill, North Carolina. They competed as members of the Atlantic Coast Conference, finishing in second.

== Schedule ==
Date	Time	Opponent	Rank	Site	Result	Attendance	Source
September 4	1:30 p.m.	No. 20 Miami (OH)*		Kenan Memorial Stadium; Chapel Hill, NC	W 14–10	34,000	
September 11	7:00 p.m.	vs. No. 18 Florida*		Tampa Stadium; Tampa, FL	W 24–21	42,262	
September 18	1:30 p.m.	Northwestern*	No. 17	Kenan Memorial Stadium; Chapel Hill, NC	W 12–0	41,000	
September 25	1:30 p.m.	at Army*	No. 16	Michie Stadium; West Point, NY	W 34–32	24,694	
October 2	1:30 p.m.	at No. 12 Missouri*	No. 14	Faurot Field; Columbia, MO	L 3–24	60,676	
October 16	1:30 p.m.	NC State		Kenan Memorial Stadium; Chapel Hill, NC (rivalry)	L 13–21	50,000	
October 23	1:30 p.m.	No. 20 East Carolina*		Kenan Memorial Stadium; Chapel Hill, NC	W 12–10	49,000	
October 30	1:30 p.m.	at Wake Forest		Groves Stadium; Winston-Salem, NC (rivalry)	W 34–14	30,150	
November 6	1:00 p.m.	at Clemson		Memorial Stadium; Clemson, SC	W 27–23	39,200	
November 13	1:30 p.m.	Virginia		Kenan Memorial Stadium; Chapel Hill, NC (South's Oldest Rivalry)	W 31–6	48,000	
November 20	1:30 p.m.	Duke		Kenan Memorial Stadium; Chapel Hill, NC (Victory Bell)	W 39–38	48,000	
December 31	2:30 p.m.	vs. Kentucky*	No. 19	Atlanta–Fulton County Stadium; Atlanta, GA (Peach Bowl)	L 0–21	54,132	
*Non-conference game; Rankings from AP Poll released prior to the game; All times are in Eastern time
