= 1976 Tulsa Golden Hurricane football team =

American college football season

1976 Tulsa Golden Hurricane football

MVC co-champion

Independence Bowl, L 16–20 vs. McNeese State
- Conference: Missouri Valley Conference
- Record: 7–4–1 (2–1–1 MVC)
- Head coach: F. A. Dry (5th season)
- Home stadium: Skelly Stadium

1976 Missouri Valley Conference football standings
	Conf.					Overall
Team	W		L		T	W		L		T
Tulsa +	2	–	1	–	1	7	–	4	–	1
New Mexico State +	2	–	1	–	1	4	–	6	–	1
West Texas State	1	–	1	–	2	4	–	5	–	2
Wichita State	2	–	2	–	0	4	–	7	–	0
Drake	1	–	3	–	0	1	–	10	–	0
+ – Conference co-champions

The 1976 Tulsa Golden Hurricane football team represented the University of Tulsa during the 1976 NCAA Division I football season. In their fifth year under head coach F. A. Dry, the Golden Hurricane compiled a 7–4–1 record, 2–1–1 against Missouri Valley Conference opponents, and tied for the conference championship.

The team's statistical leaders included Ronnie Hickerson with 1,554 passing yards, Rickey Watts with 464 rushing yards, and Cornell Webster with 622 receiving yards.

== Schedule ==
Date	Opponent	Site	Result	Attendance	Source
September 4	Richmond*	Skelly Stadium; Tulsa, OK	W 22–7	24,000	
September 11	at Oklahoma State*	Lewis Stadium; Stillwater, OK (rivalry)	L 21–33	38,000	
September 18	Memphis State*^{†}	Skelly Stadium; Tulsa, OK	W 16–14	30,350	
September 25	at No. 12 Arkansas*	Razorback Stadium; Fayetteville, AR	W 9–3	40,563	
October 2	New Mexico State	Skelly Stadium; Tulsa, OK	W 32–7	31,700	
October 16	at Cincinnati*	Nippert Stadium; Cincinnati, OH	L 7–16	17,717	
October 30	at Louisville*	Fairgrounds Stadium; Louisville, KY	W 20–10	8,068	
November 6	at Virginia Tech*	Lane Stadium; Blacksburg, VA	W 35–31	31,000	
November 13	at Drake	Drake Stadium; Des Moines, IA	W 45–20	5,182	
November 20	Wichita State	Skelly Stadium; Tulsa, OK	L 13–30	12,425	
November 27	West Texas State	Skelly Stadium; Tulsa, OK	T 17–17	7,137	
December 13	vs. McNeese State*	State Fair Stadium; Shreveport, LA (Independence Bowl)	L 16–20	15,542–19,164	
*Non-conference game; ^{†}Homecoming; Rankings from AP Poll released prior to the game

== After the season ==
=== 1977 NFL draft ===
The following Golden Hurricane players were selected in the 1977 NFL draft following the season.

Round	Pick	Player	Position	NFL club
1	14	Steve August	Tackle	Seattle Seahawks
8	201	Jimmy Stewart	Defensive back	New Orleans Saints
10	279	Giles Alexander	Defensive end	New England Patriots
12	329	I. V. Wilson	Defensive tackle	Seattle Seahawks
