= 1976 Ball State Cardinals football team =

American college football season

1976 Ball State Cardinals football

MAC champion
- Conference: Mid-American Conference
- Record: 8–3 (4–1 MAC)
- Head coach: Dave McClain (6th season)
- Captains: Art Yaroch; Mike Lecklider
- Home stadium: Ball State Stadium

1976 Mid-American Conference football standings
	Conf.					Overall
Team	W		L		T	W		L		T
Ball State $	4	–	1	–	0	8	–	3	–	0
Kent State	6	–	2	–	0	8	–	4	–	0
Ohio	6	–	2	–	0	7	–	4	–	0
Western Michigan	6	–	3	–	0	7	–	4	–	0
Central Michigan	4	–	3	–	0	7	–	4	–	0
Bowling Green	4	–	3	–	0	6	–	5	–	0
Miami (OH)	2	–	4	–	0	3	–	8	–	0
Toledo	2	–	6	–	0	3	–	8	–	0
Eastern Michigan	1	–	5	–	0	2	–	9	–	0
Northern Illinois	0	–	6	–	0	1	–	10	–	0
$ – Conference champion

The 1976 Ball State Cardinals football team was an American football team that represented Ball State University in the Mid-American Conference (MAC) during the 1976 NCAA Division I football season. In its sixth season under head coach Dave McClain, the team compiled an 8–3 record (4–1 against conference opponents) and won the school's first MAC championship. The team played its home games at Ball State Stadium in Muncie, Indiana.

The team set a school record with 2,704 rushing yards, a total that was later eclipsed by the 1987 team.

Running back Earl Taylor set the school's single-game record with 260 rushing yards against Eastern Michigan. He led the team with 1,017 rushing yards for the season. Other statistical leaders included Mike Andress with 551 receiving yards and quarterback Art Yaroch with 1,088 passing yards. Yaroch received the John Magnabosco Award as the team's most valuable player.

Five players received first-team honors on the 1976 All-MAC team: quarterback Art Yaroch; offensive guard Mitch Hoban; split end Rick Morrison; defensive back Maurice Harvey; and punter Mark O'Connell.

Art Yaroch and Mike Lecklider were the team captains.

== Schedule ==
Date	Opponent	Site	Result	Attendance	Source
September 11	Louisiana Tech*	Ball State Stadium; Muncie, IN	W 41–28	16,172	
September 18	at Miami (OH)	Miami Field; Oxford, OH	W 23–6	16,151	
September 25	at Toledo	Glass Bowl; Toledo, OH	W 27–14	15,235	
October 2	at Dayton*	Welcome Stadium; Dayton, OH	W 20–13		
October 9	at Illinois State*	Hancock Stadium; Normal, IL	L 7–10	12,000	
October 16	No. 5 (D-II) Akron*	Ball State Stadium; Muncie, IN	L 0–3	18,323	
October 23	Appalachian State*	Ball State Stadium; Muncie, IN	W 20–7	3,325	
October 30	at Northern Illinois	Huskie Stadium; DeKalb, IL (rivalry)	W 33–7	15,126	
November 6	Indiana State*	Ball State Stadium; Muncie, IN (Blue Key Victory Bell)	W 24–9	12,103	
November 13	Western Michigan	Ball State Stadium; Muncie, IN	L 10–24	10,257	
November 20	at Eastern Michigan	Rynearson Stadium; Ypsilanti, MI	W 52–3	2,500	
*Non-conference game; Rankings from AP Poll released prior to the game
