= 1976 Notre Dame Fighting Irish football team =

American college football season

1976 Notre Dame Fighting Irish football

Gator Bowl champion

Gator Bowl, W 20–9 vs. Penn State
- Conference: Independent

Ranking
- Coaches: No. 12
- AP: No. 12
- Record: 9–3
- Head coach: Dan Devine (2nd season)
- Offensive coordinator: Merv Johnson (2nd season)
- Captains: Willie Fry; Mark McLane
- Home stadium: Notre Dame Stadium

1976 NCAA Division I independents football records
	Conf.			Overall
Team	W	L	T	W		L		T
No. 1 Pittsburgh		–		12	–	0	–	0
No. 17 Rutgers		–		11	–	0	–	0
San Diego State		–		10	–	1	–	0
No. 12 Notre Dame		–		9	–	3	–	0
Colgate		–		8	–	2	–	0
Boston College		–		8	–	3	–	0
Cincinnati		–		8	–	3	–	0
Memphis State		–		7	–	4	–	0
North Texas State *		–		7	–	4	–	0
Southern Illinois		–		7	–	4	–	0
Penn State		–		7	–	5	–	0
Villanova		–		6	–	4	–	1
South Carolina		–		6	–	5	–	0
Virginia Tech		–		6	–	5	–	0
Army		–		5	–	6	–	0
Florida State		–		5	–	6	–	0
Illinois State		–		5	–	6	–	0
Richmond		–		5	–	6	–	0
West Virginia		–		5	–	6	–	0
Georgia Tech		–		4	–	6	–	1
Temple		–		4	–	6	–	0
Air Force		–		4	–	7	–	0
Dayton		–		4	–	7	–	0
Louisville		–		4	–	7	–	0
Marshall		–		4	–	7	–	0
Navy		–		4	–	7	–	0
Indiana State		–		3	–	7	–	0
Hawaii		–		3	–	8	–	0
Holy Cross		–		3	–	8	–	0
Miami (FL)		–		3	–	8	–	0
Syracuse		–		3	–	8	–	0
Utah State		–		3	–	8	–	0
Northeast Louisiana		–		2	–	9	–	0
Southern Miss		–		2	–	9	–	0
Tulane		–		2	–	9	–	0
North Texas State (originally 6–5) was awarded a forfeit win after Mississippi State was found to be using an ineligible player.; Rankings from AP Poll

The 1976 Notre Dame Fighting Irish football team was an American football team that represented the University of Notre Dame as an independent during the 1976 NCAA Division I football season. In their second year under head coach Dan Devine, the Irish compiled a 9–3 record, outscored opponents by a total of 274 to 149, and were ranked No. 12 in the final AP and UPI polls. In five games against ranked opponents, they lost to No. 9 Pittsburgh and No. 3 USC, and defeated No. 19 South Carolina, No. 10 Alabama, and No. 20 Penn State, the latter in the Gator Bowl.

Defensive end Ross Browner won the Outland Trophy as the best interior lineman in college football. Browner and tight end Ken MacAfee were consensus first-team picks on the 1976 All-America college football team. Defensive back Luther Bradley also received first-team All-America honors from the Football News and Walter Camp Football Foundation. Quarterback Joe Montana separated his shoulder before the season began and did not play. The team's statistical leaders included quarterback Rick Slager (1,281 passing yards), running back Al Hunter (1,058 rushing yards), and Dan Kelleher (24 receptions for 522 yards).

The team played its home games at Notre Dame Stadium in Notre Dame, Indiana.

== Schedule ==
Date	Time	Opponent	Rank	Site	TV	Result	Attendance	Source
September 11	4:20 p.m.	No. 9 Pittsburgh	No. 11	Notre Dame Stadium; Notre Dame, IN (rivalry)	ABC	L 10–31	59,075	
September 18	2:30 p.m.	Purdue		Notre Dame Stadium; Notre Dame, IN (rivalry)		W 23–0	59,075	
September 25	2:30 p.m.	at Northwestern		Dyche Stadium; Evanston, IL (rivalry)		W 48–0	44,396	
October 2	1:30 p.m.	at Michigan State	No. 18	Spartan Stadium; East Lansing, MI (rivalry)		W 24–6	77,081	
October 16	2:30 p.m.	Oregon	No. 14	Notre Dame Stadium; Notre Dame, IN		W 41–0	59,075	
October 23	1:10 p.m.	at No. 19 South Carolina	No. 12	Williams–Brice Stadium; Columbia, SC		W 13–6	56,721	
October 30	1:00 p.m.	vs. Navy	No. 11	Municipal Stadium; Cleveland, OH (rivalry)		W 27–21	61,172	
November 6	1:30 p.m.	at Georgia Tech	No. 11	Grant Field; Atlanta, GA (rivalry)		L 14–23	50,079	
November 13	12:50 p.m.	No. 10 Alabama	No. 18	Notre Dame Stadium; Notre Dame, IN	ABC	W 21–18	59,075	
November 20	1:30 p.m.	Miami (FL)	No. 13	Notre Dame Stadium; Notre Dame, IN (rivalry)		W 40–27	59,075	
November 27	4:00 p.m.	at No. 3 USC	No. 13	Los Angeles Memorial Coliseum; Los Angeles, CA (rivalry)	ABC	L 13–17	76,561	
December 27	9:00 p.m.	vs. No. 20 Penn State	No. 15	Gator Bowl Stadium; Jacksonville, FL (Gator Bowl, rivalry)	ABC	W 20–9	67,827	
Rankings from AP Poll released prior to the game; All times are in Eastern time

== Game summaries ==
=== Purdue ===
Purdue Boilermakers (1–0) at Notre Dame Fighting Irish (0–1)

Quarter	1	2	3	4	Total
Purdue	0	0	0	0	0
Notre Dame	3	7	7	6	23

at Notre Dame Stadium, South Bend, Indiana

- Date: September 18
- Game attendance: 59,075
- Recap/Box

Game information

First quarter

- ND – Dave Reeve 39-yard field goal, 0:47. Notre Dame 3–0. Drive:

Second quarter

- ND – Mark McLane 33-yard pass from Al Hunter (Dave Reeve kick). Notre Dame 10–0. Drive:

Third quarter

- ND – Rick Slager 1-yard run (Dave Reeve kick). Notre Dame 17–0. Drive:

Fourth quarter

- ND – Al Hunter 2-yard run (kick failed). Notre Dame 23–0. Drive: 49 yards.

Top passers

- PUR
- ND

Top rushers

- PUR
- ND

Top receivers

- PUR
- ND

=== Vs. Navy ===
Navy Midshipmen (1–6) vs. #11 Notre Dame Fighting Irish (5–1)

Quarter	1	2	3	4	Total
Notre Dame	3	21	0	3	27
Navy	0	14	0	7	21

at Cleveland Municipal Stadium, Cleveland, Ohio

- Date: October 30
- Game attendance: 61,172
- Recap/Box Score

Game information

First quarter

- ND – Dave Reeve 47-yard field goal. Notre Dame 3–0. Drive:

Second quarter

- NAVY – Dave King 17-yard pass from Bob Leszcyznski (Bob Tata kick). Navy 7–3. Drive:
- NAVY – Larry Klawinski 1-yard run (Bob Tata kick). Navy 14–3. Drive:
- ND – Dan Kelleher 58-yard pass from Rick Slager (Dave Reeve kick). Navy 14–10. Drive:
- ND – Al Hunter 5-yard run (Dave Reeve kick). Notre Dame 17–14. Drive: 60 yards.
- ND – Al Hunter 28-yard pass from Rick Slager (Dave Reeve kick). Notre Dame 24–14. Drive:

Third quarter

- No scoring

Fourth quarter

- NAVY – Reggie Thompson 1-yard run (Bob Tata kick). Notre Dame 24–21. Drive:
- ND – Dave Reeve 24-yard field goal. Notre Dame 27–21. Drive:

Top passers

- ND
- NAVY – Bob Leszcyznski – 21/45, 294 yards, TD, INT

Top rushers

- ND
- NAVY

Top receivers

- ND – Dan Kelleher – 7 receptions, 162 yards, TD
- NAVY

=== At USC ===
#13 Notre Dame Fighting Irish (8–2) at #3 USC Trojans (9–1)

Quarter	1	2	3	4	Total
Notre Dame	0	0	0	13	13
USC	0	7	7	3	17

at Los Angeles Memorial Coliseum, Los Angeles, California

- Date: November 27
- Game attendance: 76,561
- TV announcers (ABC): Keith Jackson, Ara Parseghian
- Recap/Box

Game information

First quarter

- No scoring

Second quarter

- USC – Shelton Diggs 6-yard pass from Rob Hertel (Glen Walker kick). USC 7–0. Drive: 10 plays, 67 yards.

Third quarter

- USC – Randy Simmrin 63-yard pass from Vince Evans (Glen Walker kick), 13:30. USC 14–0. Drive:

Fourth quarter

- ND – Vagas Ferguson 17-yard pass from Rusty Lisch (Dave Reeve kick), 14:06. USC 14–7. Drive: 4 plays, 68 yards.
- USC – Glen Walker 46-yard field goal. USC 17–7. Drive:
- ND – Rusty Lisch 1-yard run (two-point conversion failed). USC 17–13. Drive: 76 yards.

Top passers

- ND
- USC – Vince Evans – 6/14, 106 yards, TD

Top rushers

- ND
- USC – Ricky Bell – 21 rushes, 75 yards

Top receivers

- ND
- USC – Randy Simmrin – 6 receptions, 121 yards, TD

Rick Slager started the game but was replaced by Rusty Lisch after Slagler injured his shoulder.

== Roster ==
1976 Notre Dame Fighting Irish football team roster
Players
Coaches
Offense

Pos.	#	Name	Class
RB		Willard Browner
TE	83	Doug Buth	Sr
OL		Mike Carney
RB		Tom Domin
TE	87	John Driscoll	Jr
RB	40	Terry Eurick	Jr
RB		Vagas Ferguson
QB		Gary Forystek
WR	82	Kris Haines	So
WR		Speedy Hart
RB	30	Jerome Heavens	So
OL		Ted Horansky
RB	25	Al Hunter	Jr
OT	62	Dave Huffman	So
G	65	Ernie Hughes	Jr
WR	80	Dan Kelleher	Sr
RB	21	Dan Knott	Jr
QB		Rusty Lisch	Fr
TE	81	Ken MacAfee	Jr
OT	71	Steve McDaniel	Jr
RB		Mark McLane (C)
G	60	Howard Meyer	So
QB	3	Joe Montana	So
G	57	Elton Moore	Sr
RB	14	Steve Orsini	Jr
RB		Steve Schmitz
QB	11	Rick Slager
OT	50	Bob Tull	Jr
OL		Harry Woebkenberg

Defense

Pos.	#	Name	Class
LB		Doug Becker
S	20	Luther Bradley	Jr
S	33	Jim Browner	So
DE	89	Ross Browner	Jr
DB		Ted Burgmeier
DL		Mike Calhoun
S	28	Ross Christensen	Jr
LB	24	Nick DeCicco	Jr
DT	72	Ken Dike	Jr
S	41	John Dubenetzky	Sr
LB	42	Tom Eastman	Sr
DE	94	Willie Fry (C)	Jr
LB	55	Bob Golic	So
S	10	Randy Harrison	Jr
LB	58	Steve Heimkreiter	So
LB	51	Pete Johnson	Jr
LB	54	Marv Russell	Sr
DB		Dave Waymer	Fr
DT	74	Jeff Weston	Jr
		Tony Zappala

Special teams

Pos.	#	Name	Class
K		Dave Reeve
P	7	Joe Restic	So

Head coach

- Dan Devine

Coordinators/assistant coaches

Legend

- (C) Team captain
- (S) Suspended
- (I) Ineligible
- Injured
- Redshirt

Roster
Last update: 2021-Jan-07
