= 1976 Navy Midshipmen football team =

American college football season

1976 Navy Midshipmen football
- Conference: Independent
- Record: 4–7
- Head coach: George Welsh (4th season)
- Captains: Jeff Sapp; Kevin Sullivan
- Home stadium: Navy–Marine Corps Memorial Stadium

1976 NCAA Division I independents football records
	Conf.			Overall
Team	W	L	T	W		L		T
No. 1 Pittsburgh		–		12	–	0	–	0
No. 17 Rutgers		–		11	–	0	–	0
San Diego State		–		10	–	1	–	0
No. 12 Notre Dame		–		9	–	3	–	0
Colgate		–		8	–	2	–	0
Boston College		–		8	–	3	–	0
Cincinnati		–		8	–	3	–	0
Memphis State		–		7	–	4	–	0
North Texas State *		–		7	–	4	–	0
Southern Illinois		–		7	–	4	–	0
Penn State		–		7	–	5	–	0
Villanova		–		6	–	4	–	1
South Carolina		–		6	–	5	–	0
Virginia Tech		–		6	–	5	–	0
Army		–		5	–	6	–	0
Florida State		–		5	–	6	–	0
Illinois State		–		5	–	6	–	0
Richmond		–		5	–	6	–	0
West Virginia		–		5	–	6	–	0
Georgia Tech		–		4	–	6	–	1
Temple		–		4	–	6	–	0
Air Force		–		4	–	7	–	0
Dayton		–		4	–	7	–	0
Louisville		–		4	–	7	–	0
Marshall		–		4	–	7	–	0
Navy		–		4	–	7	–	0
Indiana State		–		3	–	7	–	0
Hawaii		–		3	–	8	–	0
Holy Cross		–		3	–	8	–	0
Miami (FL)		–		3	–	8	–	0
Syracuse		–		3	–	8	–	0
Utah State		–		3	–	8	–	0
Northeast Louisiana		–		2	–	9	–	0
Southern Miss		–		2	–	9	–	0
Tulane		–		2	–	9	–	0
North Texas State (originally 6–5) was awarded a forfeit win after Mississippi State was found to be using an ineligible player.; Rankings from AP Poll

The 1976 Navy Midshipmen football team represented the United States Naval Academy (USNA) as an independent during the 1976 NCAA Division I football season. The team was led by fourth-year head coach George Welsh.

== Schedule ==
Date	Time	Opponent	Site	Result	Attendance	Source
September 11		Rutgers	Navy–Marine Corps Memorial Stadium; Annapolis, MD	L 3–13	17,501	
September 18		at Connecticut	Memorial Stadium; Storrs, CT	W 21–3	15,906	
September 25		at No. 1 Michigan	Michigan Stadium; Ann Arbor, MI	L 14–70	101,040	
October 2		No. 15 Boston College	Navy–Marine Corps Memorial Stadium; Annapolis, MD	L 13–17	16,156	
October 9		at Air Force	Falcon Stadium; Colorado Springs, CO (Commander-in-Chief's Trophy)	L 3–13		
October 16		William & Mary	Navy–Marine Corps Memorial Stadium; Annapolis, MD	L 13–21	21,681	
October 23		No. 2 Pittsburgh	Navy–Marine Corps Memorial Stadium; Annapolis, MD	L 0–45	26,346	
October 30	1:30 p.m.	vs. No. 11 Notre Dame	Municipal Stadium; Cleveland, OH (rivalry)	L 21–27	61,172	
November 6		at Syracuse	Archbold Stadium; Syracuse, NY	W 27–10	22,333	
November 13		Georgia Tech	Navy–Marine Corps Memorial Stadium; Annapolis, MD	W 34–28	20,010	
November 27		vs. Army	John F. Kennedy Stadium; Philadelphia, PA (Army–Navy Game)	W 38–10	77,612	
Rankings from AP Poll released prior to the game; All times are in Eastern time

== Game summaries ==
=== Vs. Notre Dame ===
Navy Midshipmen (1–6) vs. #11 Notre Dame Fighting Irish (5–1)

Quarter	1	2	3	4	Total
Notre Dame	3	21	0	3	27
Navy	0	14	0	7	21

at Cleveland Municipal Stadium, Cleveland, Ohio

- Date: October 30
- Game attendance: 61,172
- Recap/Box Score

Game information

First quarter

- ND – Dave Reeve 47-yard field goal. Notre Dame 3–0. Drive:

Second quarter

- NAVY – Dave King 17-yard pass from Bob Leszcyznski (Bob Tata kick). Navy 7–3. Drive:
- NAVY – Larry Klawinski 1-yard run (Bob Tata kick). Navy 14–3. Drive:
- ND – Dan Kelleher 58-yard pass from Rick Slager (Dave Reeve kick). Navy 14–10. Drive:
- ND – Al Hunter 5-yard run (Dave Reeve kick). Notre Dame 17–14. Drive: 60 yards.
- ND – Al Hunter 28-yard pass from Rick Slager (Dave Reeve kick). Notre Dame 24–14. Drive:

Third quarter

- No scoring

Fourth quarter

- NAVY – Reggie Thompson 1-yard run (Bob Tata kick). Notre Dame 24–21. Drive:
- ND – Dave Reeve 24-yard field goal. Notre Dame 27–21. Drive:

Top passers

- ND
- NAVY – Bob Leszcyznski – 21/45, 294 yards, TD, INT

Top rushers

- ND
- NAVY

Top receivers

- ND – Dan Kelleher – 7 receptions, 162 yards, TD
- NAVY

=== Vs. Army ===
Army Cadets (5–5) vs. Navy Midshipmen (3–7)

Quarter	1	2	3	4	Total
Army	0	10	0	0	10
Navy	7	7	17	7	38

at JFK Stadium, Philadelphia, Pennsylvania

- Date: November 27
- Game weather: Cloudy
- Game attendance: 77,612

Game information

First quarter

- NAVY – Joe Gattuso 2-yard run (Bob Tata kick), 0:15. Navy 7–0. Drive: 51 yards.

Second quarter

- ARMY – Greg King 11-yard run (Mike Castelli kick). Tie 7–7. Drive:
- NAVY – Phil McConkey 11-yard pass from Bob Leszczynski (Bob Tata kick). Navy 14–7. Drive: 57 yards.
- ARMY – Mike Castelli 37-yard field goal. Navy 14–10. Drive:

Third quarter

- NAVY – Joe Gattuso 20-yard run (Bob Tata kick). Navy 21–10. Drive: 75 yards.
- NAVY – Joe Gattuso 1-yard run (Bob Tata kick). Navy 28–10. Drive: 65 yards.
- NAVY – Bob Tata 33-yard field goal. Navy 31–10. Drive:

Fourth quarter

- NAVY – Dave King 16-yard pass from Bob Leszczynski (Bob Tata kick). Navy 38–10. Drive: 30 yards.

Top passers

- ARMY – Leamon Hall – 13/31, 3 INT
- NAVY – Bob Leszczynski – 2 TD

Top rushers

- ARMY
- NAVY – Joe Gattuso – 29 rushes, 128 yards, 3 TD

Top receivers

- ARMY
- NAVY

== Roster ==
1976 Navy Midshipmen football team roster
Players
Coaches
Offense

Pos.	#	Name	Class
FB		Steve Chafin
OL		Jim Chamberlain
OL		Gene Cioni
OL		Ray Fritsch
RB		Joe Gattuso
OL		Cary Hithon
WB		Dave King	Fr
RB		Larry Klawinski
QB		John Kurowski
QB	15	Bob Leszczynski	So
WR		Phil McConkey
RB		Leon Miller
OL	71	Mark Poston
OL		Kevin Ryan
WR		Steve Scott
TE		Kevin Sullivan
RB		Reggie Thompson

Defense

Pos.	#	Name	Class
LB		Otto Bulich
DB		Greg Byrd
DL		Pete Caulk
LB		Bob DeStafney
DB		Mike Galpin
DL		Kelvin Graham
DL		Jeff Hoobler
		Gregg Milo
MG		Jeff Sapp
DB		Larry Simpson
DL		John Snyder
DB		John Sturges

Special teams

Pos.	#	Name	Class
P		Art Ohanian
K		Bob Tata	So

Head coach

- George Welsh

Coordinators/assistant coaches

- Len Fontes – Defensive backs

Legend

- (C) Team captain
- (S) Suspended
- (I) Ineligible
- Injured
- Redshirt
