= 1976 Memphis State Tigers football team =

American college football season

1976 Memphis State Tigers football
- Conference: Independent
- Record: 8–3
- Head coach: Richard Williamson (2nd season)
- Offensive coordinator: Jim Ragland (2nd season)
- Captain: Bob Rush
- Home stadium: Liberty Bowl Memorial Stadium

1976 NCAA Division I independents football records
	Conf.			Overall
Team	W	L	T	W		L		T
No. 1 Pittsburgh		–		12	–	0	–	0
No. 17 Rutgers		–		11	–	0	–	0
San Diego State		–		10	–	1	–	0
No. 12 Notre Dame		–		9	–	3	–	0
Colgate		–		8	–	2	–	0
Boston College		–		8	–	3	–	0
Cincinnati		–		8	–	3	–	0
Memphis State		–		7	–	4	–	0
North Texas State *		–		7	–	4	–	0
Southern Illinois		–		7	–	4	–	0
Penn State		–		7	–	5	–	0
Villanova		–		6	–	4	–	1
South Carolina		–		6	–	5	–	0
Virginia Tech		–		6	–	5	–	0
Army		–		5	–	6	–	0
Florida State		–		5	–	6	–	0
Illinois State		–		5	–	6	–	0
Richmond		–		5	–	6	–	0
West Virginia		–		5	–	6	–	0
Georgia Tech		–		4	–	6	–	1
Temple		–		4	–	6	–	0
Air Force		–		4	–	7	–	0
Dayton		–		4	–	7	–	0
Louisville		–		4	–	7	–	0
Marshall		–		4	–	7	–	0
Navy		–		4	–	7	–	0
Indiana State		–		3	–	7	–	0
Hawaii		–		3	–	8	–	0
Holy Cross		–		3	–	8	–	0
Miami (FL)		–		3	–	8	–	0
Syracuse		–		3	–	8	–	0
Utah State		–		3	–	8	–	0
Northeast Louisiana		–		2	–	9	–	0
Southern Miss		–		2	–	9	–	0
Tulane		–		2	–	9	–	0
North Texas State (originally 6–5) was awarded a forfeit win after Mississippi State was found to be using an ineligible player.; Rankings from AP Poll

The 1976 Memphis State Tigers football team represented Memphis State University (now known as the University of Memphis) as an independent during the 1976 NCAA Division I football season. In its second season under head coach Richard Williamson, the team compiled an 7–4 record and outscored opponents by a total of 241 to 182. The team played its home games at Liberty Bowl Memorial Stadium in Memphis, Tennessee.

The team's statistical leaders included Lloyd Patterson with 1,563 passing yards and 42 points scored, Terdell Middleton with 919 rushing yards, Ricky Rivas with 529 receiving yards.

== Schedule ==
Date	Opponent	Site	Result	Attendance	Source
September 4	Ole Miss	Liberty Bowl Memorial Stadium; Memphis, TN (rivalry)	W 21–16	51,187	
September 11	Florida State	Liberty Bowl Memorial Stadium; Memphis, TN	W 21–12	30,194	
September 18	at Tulsa	Skelly Stadium; Tulsa, OK	L 14–16	30,350	
October 2	SMU	Liberty Bowl Memorial Stadium; Memphis, TN	W 27–13	31,424	
October 9	Auburn^{†}	Liberty Bowl Memorial Stadium; Memphis, TN	W 28–27	48,561	
October 16	Mississippi State	Liberty Bowl Memorial Stadium; Memphis, TN	W 33–42 (Miss. State forfeit)	51,704	
October 23	Wichita State	Liberty Bowl Memorial Stadium; Memphis, TN	W 31–0	15,555	
October 30	at Tulane	Louisiana Superdome; New Orleans, LA	W 14–7		
November 6	Tennessee	Liberty Bowl Memorial Stadium; Memphis, TN	L 14–21	52,311	
November 13	at Louisville	Fairgrounds Stadium; Louisville, KY (rivalry)	W 26–14	9,943	
November 20	at Southern Miss	M. M. Roberts Stadium; Hattiesburg, MS (rivalry)	L 12–14	12,154	
^{†}Homecoming
