= 1976 Connecticut Huskies football team =

American college football season

1976 Connecticut Huskies football
- Conference: Yankee Conference
- Record: 2–9 (2–3 Yankee)
- Head coach: Larry Naviaux (4th season)
- Home stadium: Memorial Stadium

1976 Yankee Conference football standings
| | Conf. | | | | | Overall |
| Team | W | | L | | T | W | | L | | T |
|---|---|---|---|---|---|---|---|---|---|---|
| No. T–8 New Hampshire $^ | 4 | – | 1 | – | 0 | 8 | – | 3 | – | 0 |
| UMass | 3 | – | 2 | – | 0 | 5 | – | 5 | – | 0 |
| Maine | 2 | – | 3 | – | 0 | 6 | – | 5 | – | 0 |
| Rhode Island | 2 | – | 3 | – | 0 | 3 | – | 5 | – | 0 |
| Boston University | 2 | – | 3 | – | 0 | 3 | – | 7 | – | 0 |
| Connecticut | 2 | – | 3 | – | 0 | 2 | – | 9 | – | 0 |
$ – Conference champion; ^ – NCAA Division II playoff participant; Rankings from Associated Press poll

The 1976 Connecticut Huskies football team represented the University of Connecticut in the 1976 NCAA Division II football season. The Huskies were led by fourth year head coach Larry Naviaux, and completed the season with a record of 2–9.

== Schedule ==
| Date | Opponent | Site | Result | Attendance | Source |
|---|---|---|---|---|---|
| September 11 | at Colgate* | Andy Kerr Stadium; Hamilton, NY | L 7–13 | 5,000–5,300 | |
| September 18 | Navy* | Memorial Stadium; Storrs, CT | L 3–21 | 15,906 | |
| September 25 | at Yale* | Yale Bowl; New Haven, CT | L 10–21 | 21,860 | |
| October 2 | at New Hampshire | Cowell Stadium; Durham, NH | L 21–24 | 10,450 | |
| October 9 | at Rutgers* | Rutgers Stadium; Piscataway, NJ | L 0–38 | 8,500 | |
| October 16 | Maine | Memorial Stadium; Storrs, CT | L 13–24 | 8,151–8,200 | |
| October 23 | at UMass | Alumni Stadium; Amherst, MA (rivalry) | W 28–6 | 14,900 | |
| October 30 | No. 8 Delaware* | Memorial Stadium; Storrs, CT | L 6–30 | 9,956 | |
| November 6 | Boston University | Memorial Stadium; Storrs, CT | W 40–11 | 3,707–3,787 | |
| November 13 | Rhode Island | Memorial Stadium; Storrs, CT (rivalry) | L 14–17 | 5,880 | |
| November 20 | at Holy Cross* | Fitton Field; Worcester, MA | L 40–41 | 8,179 | |
*Non-conference game; Rankings from AP Poll released prior to the game
