= 1976 South Carolina Gamecocks football team =

American college football season

1976 South Carolina Gamecocks football
- Conference: Independent
- Record: 6–5
- Head coach: Jim Carlen (2nd season)
- Defensive coordinator: Richard Bell (2nd season)
- Home stadium: Williams–Brice Stadium

1976 NCAA Division I independents football records
	Conf.			Overall
Team	W	L	T	W		L		T
No. 1 Pittsburgh		–		12	–	0	–	0
No. 17 Rutgers		–		11	–	0	–	0
San Diego State		–		10	–	1	–	0
No. 12 Notre Dame		–		9	–	3	–	0
Colgate		–		8	–	2	–	0
Boston College		–		8	–	3	–	0
Cincinnati		–		8	–	3	–	0
Memphis State		–		7	–	4	–	0
North Texas State *		–		7	–	4	–	0
Southern Illinois		–		7	–	4	–	0
Penn State		–		7	–	5	–	0
Villanova		–		6	–	4	–	1
South Carolina		–		6	–	5	–	0
Virginia Tech		–		6	–	5	–	0
Army		–		5	–	6	–	0
Florida State		–		5	–	6	–	0
Illinois State		–		5	–	6	–	0
Richmond		–		5	–	6	–	0
West Virginia		–		5	–	6	–	0
Georgia Tech		–		4	–	6	–	1
Temple		–		4	–	6	–	0
Air Force		–		4	–	7	–	0
Dayton		–		4	–	7	–	0
Louisville		–		4	–	7	–	0
Marshall		–		4	–	7	–	0
Navy		–		4	–	7	–	0
Indiana State		–		3	–	7	–	0
Hawaii		–		3	–	8	–	0
Holy Cross		–		3	–	8	–	0
Miami (FL)		–		3	–	8	–	0
Syracuse		–		3	–	8	–	0
Utah State		–		3	–	8	–	0
Northeast Louisiana		–		2	–	9	–	0
Southern Miss		–		2	–	9	–	0
Tulane		–		2	–	9	–	0
North Texas State (originally 6–5) was awarded a forfeit win after Mississippi State was found to be using an ineligible player.; Rankings from AP Poll

The 1976 South Carolina Gamecocks football team represented the University of South Carolina as an independent during the 1976 NCAA Division I football season. Led by second-year head coach Jim Carlen, the Gamecocks compiled a record of 6–5. The team played its home games at Williams–Brice Stadium.

After an upset over No. 16 Ole Miss, South Carolina was ranked No. 19 in the country, the program's highest ranking since 1971. It was also the first time the Gamecocks had been ranked in the top twenty in two consecutive seasons since 1959. However, the Gamecocks lost three of their last four games, and finished the season unranked.

== Schedule ==
Date	Opponent	Rank	Site	TV	Result	Attendance	Source
September 4	Appalachian State		Williams–Brice Stadium; Columbia, SC		W 21–10	44,536	
September 11	at Georgia Tech		Grant Field; Atlanta, GA	ABC	W 27–17	38,923	
September 18	Duke		Williams–Brice Stadium; Columbia, SC		W 24–6	52,237	
September 25	at No. 7 Georgia		Sanford Stadium; Athens, GA (rivalry)		L 12–20	59,925	
October 2	at Baylor		Baylor Stadium; Waco, TX		L 17–18	34,500	
October 9	Virginia		Williams–Brice Stadium; Columbia, SC		W 35–7	47,239	
October 16	No. 16 Ole Miss		Williams–Brice Stadium; Columbia, SC		W 10–7	53,079	
October 23	No. 12 Notre Dame	No. 19	Williams–Brice Stadium; Columbia, SC		L 6–13	56,721	
October 30	NC State		Williams–Brice Stadium; Columbia, SC		W 27–7	50,703	
November 13	Wake Forest	No. 20	Williams–Brice Stadium; Columbia, SC		L 7–10	49,779	
November 20	at Clemson		Memorial Stadium; Clemson, South Carolina (rivalry)		L 9–28	54,129	
Rankings from AP Poll released prior to the game

== Roster ==
1976 South Carolina Gamecocks football team roster
Players
Coaches
Offense

Pos.	#	Name	Class
QB	10	Ronnie Bass	Jr
C	65	Danny Clancy	So
G	66	Steve Courson	Sr
OT	76	Mike Fralic	So
OT	75	Stan James	Jr
WR	40	Philip Logan	Jr
RB	32	Kevin Long	Sr
WR	41	Zion McKinney	Fr
OT	78	Jerome Provence	Jr
G	61	Tami Tarbush	Jr
TE	45	Brad Thomas	Jr
RB	33	Clarence Williams	Sr

Defense

Pos.	#	Name	Class
DT	71	Charles Barber	Sr
DE	80	Scott Blackman	Jr
DB	24	Bill Currier	Sr
LB	57	John Green	Jr
DE	82	Rus Mangari	Sr
LB	50	David Prezioso	Jr
DB	25	Rick Sanford	So
LB	54	Tim Singleton	Fr

Special teams

Pos.	#	Name	Class
P	14	Max Runager	So
K	15	Steve Young	Sr

Head coach

- Jim Carlen

Coordinators/assistant coaches

Legend

- (C) Team captain
- (S) Suspended
- (I) Ineligible
- Injured
- Redshirt

== Team players in the NFL ==
Player	Position	Round	Pick	NFL club
Clarence Williams	Running back	5	124	San Diego Chargers
Steve Courson	Guard	5	125	Pittsburgh Steelers
Kevin Long	Running back	7	195	New York Jets
Bill Currier	Safety	9	232	Houston Oilers
