= 1976 North Texas State Mean Green football team =

American college football season

1976 North Texas State Mean Green football
- Conference: Independent
- Record: 7–4
- Head coach: Hayden Fry (4th season)
- Home stadium: Fouts Field

1976 NCAA Division I independents football records
	Conf.			Overall
Team	W	L	T	W		L		T
No. 1 Pittsburgh		–		12	–	0	–	0
No. 17 Rutgers		–		11	–	0	–	0
San Diego State		–		10	–	1	–	0
No. 12 Notre Dame		–		9	–	3	–	0
Colgate		–		8	–	2	–	0
Boston College		–		8	–	3	–	0
Cincinnati		–		8	–	3	–	0
Memphis State		–		7	–	4	–	0
North Texas State *		–		7	–	4	–	0
Southern Illinois		–		7	–	4	–	0
Penn State		–		7	–	5	–	0
Villanova		–		6	–	4	–	1
South Carolina		–		6	–	5	–	0
Virginia Tech		–		6	–	5	–	0
Army		–		5	–	6	–	0
Florida State		–		5	–	6	–	0
Illinois State		–		5	–	6	–	0
Richmond		–		5	–	6	–	0
West Virginia		–		5	–	6	–	0
Georgia Tech		–		4	–	6	–	1
Temple		–		4	–	6	–	0
Air Force		–		4	–	7	–	0
Dayton		–		4	–	7	–	0
Louisville		–		4	–	7	–	0
Marshall		–		4	–	7	–	0
Navy		–		4	–	7	–	0
Indiana State		–		3	–	7	–	0
Hawaii		–		3	–	8	–	0
Holy Cross		–		3	–	8	–	0
Miami (FL)		–		3	–	8	–	0
Syracuse		–		3	–	8	–	0
Utah State		–		3	–	8	–	0
Northeast Louisiana		–		2	–	9	–	0
Southern Miss		–		2	–	9	–	0
Tulane		–		2	–	9	–	0
North Texas State (originally 6–5) was awarded a forfeit win after Mississippi State was found to be using an ineligible player.; Rankings from AP Poll

The 1976 North Texas State Mean Green football team represented North Texas State University—now known as the University of North Texas—during the 1976 NCAA Division I football season. In its fourth season under head coach Hayden Fry, the team compiled a 7–4 record. The team played its home games at Fouts Field in Denton, Texas.

== Schedule ==
Date	Opponent	Site	Result	Attendance	Source
September 4	at Mississippi State	Scott Field; Starkville, MS	W 0–7 (forfeit)	29,000	
September 11	UT Arlington	Fouts Field; Denton, TX	W 24–7	14,800	
September 18	at No. 19 Texas	Memorial Stadium; Austin, TX	L 14–17	60,130	
September 25	vs. SMU	Texas Stadium; Irving, TX (rivalry)	L 31–38	25,539	
October 2	at Oklahoma State	Lewis Field; Stillwater, OK	L 10–16	35,500	
October 9	Cal Poly Pomona	Fouts Field; Denton, TX	W 21–10	11,200	
October 16	at West Texas State	Kimbrough Memorial Stadium; Canyon, TX	W 10–7	10,500	
October 23	at New Mexico State	Memorial Stadium; Las Cruces, NM	W 25–14	8,369	
October 30	at Louisiana Tech	State Fair Stadium; Shreveport, LA	W 14–8	6,532	
November 13	Florida State^{†}	Fouts Field; Denton, TX	L 20–21	3,850	
November 20	Drake	Fouts Field; Denton, TX	W 63–0	6,100	
^{†}Homecoming; Rankings from AP Poll released prior to the game

== Roster ==
1976 North Texas Mean Green football team roster
Players
Coaches
Offense

Pos.	#	Name	Class
RB		Bernard Jackson (injured)	Fr
RB		Mike Jones	Jr
WR		Tim Loftin	Jr
QB		Ken Washington	Jr

Defense

Pos.	#	Name	Class
DL	65	Walter Chapman	Jr
DB	44	J. T. Smith	Jr
LB		Burks Washington	So

Special teams

Pos.	#	Name	Class
K	3	Iseed Khoury	Jr

Head coach

- Hayden Fry

Coordinators/assistant coaches

- Bill Brashier
- Bill Snyder

Legend

- (C) Team captain
- (S) Suspended
- (I) Ineligible
- Injured
- Redshirt
