= 1976 Penn State Nittany Lions football team =

American college football season

1976 Penn State Nittany Lions football

Gator Bowl, L 9–20 vs. Notre Dame
- Conference: Independent
- Record: 7–5
- Head coach: Joe Paterno (11th season)
- Offensive scheme: I formation
- Defensive coordinator: Jim O'Hora (11th season)
- Base defense: 4–3
- Home stadium: Beaver Stadium

1976 NCAA Division I independents football records
	Conf.			Overall
Team	W	L	T	W		L		T
No. 1 Pittsburgh		–		12	–	0	–	0
No. 17 Rutgers		–		11	–	0	–	0
San Diego State		–		10	–	1	–	0
No. 12 Notre Dame		–		9	–	3	–	0
Colgate		–		8	–	2	–	0
Boston College		–		8	–	3	–	0
Cincinnati		–		8	–	3	–	0
Memphis State		–		7	–	4	–	0
North Texas State *		–		7	–	4	–	0
Southern Illinois		–		7	–	4	–	0
Penn State		–		7	–	5	–	0
Villanova		–		6	–	4	–	1
South Carolina		–		6	–	5	–	0
Virginia Tech		–		6	–	5	–	0
Army		–		5	–	6	–	0
Florida State		–		5	–	6	–	0
Illinois State		–		5	–	6	–	0
Richmond		–		5	–	6	–	0
West Virginia		–		5	–	6	–	0
Georgia Tech		–		4	–	6	–	1
Temple		–		4	–	6	–	0
Air Force		–		4	–	7	–	0
Dayton		–		4	–	7	–	0
Louisville		–		4	–	7	–	0
Marshall		–		4	–	7	–	0
Navy		–		4	–	7	–	0
Indiana State		–		3	–	7	–	0
Hawaii		–		3	–	8	–	0
Holy Cross		–		3	–	8	–	0
Miami (FL)		–		3	–	8	–	0
Syracuse		–		3	–	8	–	0
Utah State		–		3	–	8	–	0
Northeast Louisiana		–		2	–	9	–	0
Southern Miss		–		2	–	9	–	0
Tulane		–		2	–	9	–	0
North Texas State (originally 6–5) was awarded a forfeit win after Mississippi State was found to be using an ineligible player.; Rankings from AP Poll

The 1976 Penn State Nittany Lions football team represented Pennsylvania State University as an independent during the 1976 NCAA Division I football season. Led by 11th-year head coach Joe Paterno, the Nittany Lions compiled a record of 7–5 with a loss to Notre Dame in the Gator Bowl. Penn State played home games at Beaver Stadium in University Park, Pennsylvania.

== Schedule ==
Date	Opponent	Rank	Site	TV	Result	Attendance	Source
September 11	Stanford	No. 10	Beaver Stadium; University Park, PA		W 15–12	61,645	
September 18	No. 2 Ohio State	No. 7	Beaver Stadium; University Park, PA (rivalry)	ABC	L 7–12	62,503	
September 25	Iowa	No. 11	Beaver Stadium; University Park, PA		L 6–7	61,268	
October 2	at Kentucky	No. 20	Commonwealth Stadium; Lexington, KY		L 6–22	57,723	
October 9	Army		Beaver Stadium; University Park, PA		W 38–16	60,436	
October 16	Syracuse^{†}		Beaver Stadium; University Park, PA (rivalry)		W 27–3	61,474	
October 23	at West Virginia		Mountaineer Field; Morgantown, WV (rivalry)		W 33–0	37,762	
October 30	at Temple		Veterans Stadium; Philadelphia, PA		W 31–30	42,005	
November 6	NC State		Beaver Stadium; University Park, PA		W 41–20	60,426	
November 13	at Miami (FL)		Miami Orange Bowl; Miami, FL		W 21–7	19,627	
November 26	at No. 1 Pittsburgh	No. 16	Three Rivers Stadium; Pittsburgh, PA (rivalry)	ABC	L 7–24	50,360	
December 27	vs. No. 15 Notre Dame	No. 20	Gator Bowl Stadium; Jacksonville, FL (Gator Bowl) (rivalry)	ABC	L 9–20	67,827	
^{†}Homecoming; Rankings from AP Poll released prior to the game

== Roster ==
1976 Penn State Nittany Lions football team roster
Players
Coaches
Offense

Pos.	#	Name	Class
OT	71	Brad Benson	Sr
WR	44	Jimmy Cefalo	Jr
OT	68	Eric Cummingham	So
OT	71	Keith Dorney	So
WR	46	Scott Fitzkee	So
QB	14	Chuck Fusina	So
OT	68	George Reihner	Sr
TE	82	Mickey Shuler	Jr

Defense

Pos.	#	Name	Class
LB	53	Kurt Allerman	Sr
DB	25	Tom Bradley	So
DE	64	Ron Crosby	Sr
LB	95	Tom DePaso	Jr
DE	28	Rich Milot	So
DT	78	Randy Sidler	Jr

Special teams

Pos.	#	Name	Class

Head coach

- Joe Paterno

Coordinators/assistant coaches

- Dick Anderson
- Booker Brooks
- John Chuckran
- Gregg Ducatte
- Fran Ganter
- Jim O'Hora
- Bob Phillips
- John Rosenberg
- Jerry Sandusky
- J. T. White

Legend

- (C) Team captain
- (S) Suspended
- (I) Ineligible
- Injured
- Redshirt

== NFL draft ==
Four Nittany Lions were drafted in the 1977 NFL draft.

Round	Pick	Overall	Name	Position	Team
2nd	10	38	George Reihner	Offensive guard	Houston Oilers
3rd	22	78	Kurt Allerman	Linebacker	St. Louis Cardinals
5th	2	114	Ron Crosby	Linebacker	Detroit Lions
8th	24	219	Brad Benson	Offensive tackle	New England Patriots
