= 1976 Syracuse Orangemen football team =

American college football season

1976 Syracuse Orangemen football
- Conference: Independent
- Record: 3–8
- Head coach: Frank Maloney (3rd season)
- Offensive coordinator: Tom Coughlin (1st season)
- Captain: William Zanovitch
- Home stadium: Archbold Stadium

1976 NCAA Division I independents football records
	Conf.			Overall
Team	W	L	T	W		L		T
No. 1 Pittsburgh		–		12	–	0	–	0
No. 17 Rutgers		–		11	–	0	–	0
San Diego State		–		10	–	1	–	0
No. 12 Notre Dame		–		9	–	3	–	0
Colgate		–		8	–	2	–	0
Boston College		–		8	–	3	–	0
Cincinnati		–		8	–	3	–	0
Memphis State		–		7	–	4	–	0
North Texas State *		–		7	–	4	–	0
Southern Illinois		–		7	–	4	–	0
Penn State		–		7	–	5	–	0
Villanova		–		6	–	4	–	1
South Carolina		–		6	–	5	–	0
Virginia Tech		–		6	–	5	–	0
Army		–		5	–	6	–	0
Florida State		–		5	–	6	–	0
Illinois State		–		5	–	6	–	0
Richmond		–		5	–	6	–	0
West Virginia		–		5	–	6	–	0
Georgia Tech		–		4	–	6	–	1
Temple		–		4	–	6	–	0
Air Force		–		4	–	7	–	0
Dayton		–		4	–	7	–	0
Louisville		–		4	–	7	–	0
Marshall		–		4	–	7	–	0
Navy		–		4	–	7	–	0
Indiana State		–		3	–	7	–	0
Hawaii		–		3	–	8	–	0
Holy Cross		–		3	–	8	–	0
Miami (FL)		–		3	–	8	–	0
Syracuse		–		3	–	8	–	0
Utah State		–		3	–	8	–	0
Northeast Louisiana		–		2	–	9	–	0
Southern Miss		–		2	–	9	–	0
Tulane		–		2	–	9	–	0
North Texas State (originally 6–5) was awarded a forfeit win after Mississippi State was found to be using an ineligible player.; Rankings from AP Poll

The 1976 Syracuse Orangemen football team represented Syracuse University as an independent during the 1976 NCAA Division I football season. The team was led by third-year head coach Frank Maloney and played their home games at Archbold Stadium in Syracuse, New York. The team finished with a record of 3–8.

== Schedule ==
Date	Opponent	Site	Result	Attendance	Source
September 11	Bowling Green	Archbold Stadium; Syracuse, NY	L 7–22	23,859	
September 18	at Iowa	Kinnick Stadium; Iowa City, IA	L 3–41	54,129	
September 25	No. 8 Maryland	Archbold Stadium; Syracuse, NY	L 28–42	21,109	
October 2	Oregon State	Archbold Stadium; Syracuse, NY	W 21–3	18,591	
October 9	Tulane	Archbold Stadium; Syracuse, NY	W 3–0	11,223	
October 16	at Penn State	Beaver Stadium; University Park, PA (rivalry)	L 3–27	61,474	
October 23	Temple	Archbold Stadium; Syracuse, NY	W 24–16	19,152	
October 30	at No. 2 Pittsburgh	Pitt Stadium; Pittsburgh, PA (rivalry)	L 13–23	50,390	
November 6	Navy	Archbold Stadium; Syracuse, NY	L 10–27	22,333	
November 13	at Boston College	Alumni Stadium; Chestnut Hill, MA	L 14–28	25,433	
November 20	at West Virginia	Mountaineer Field; Morgantown, WV (rivalry)	L 28–34	27,848	
Rankings from AP Poll released prior to the game

== Roster ==
1976 Syracuse Orangemen football team roster
Players
Coaches
Offense

Pos.	#	Name	Class
WR	82	Art Monk	Fr
G	64	Craig Wolfley	Fr

Defense

Pos.	#	Name	Class
DT	71	Ken Clarke	Jr
S	7	Tim Moresco	Sr

Special teams

Pos.	#	Name	Class
K	1	Dave Jacobs	So

Head coach

- Frank Maloney

Coordinators/assistant coaches

Legend

- (C) Team captain
- (S) Suspended
- (I) Ineligible
- Injured
- Redshirt
