= 1976 Air Force Falcons football team =

American college football season

1976 Air Force Falcons football
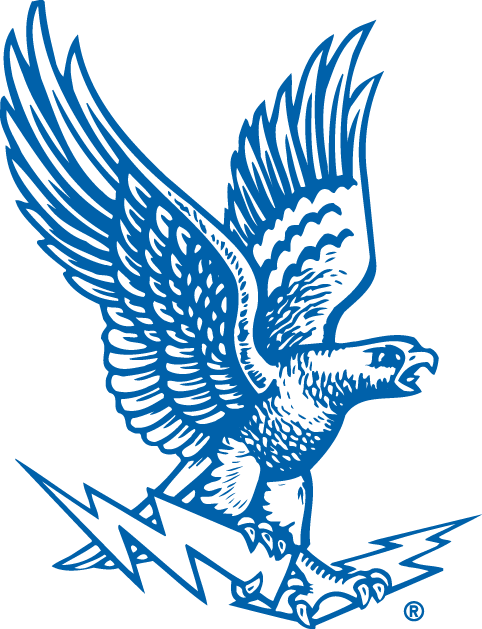
- Conference: Independent
- Record: 4–7
- Head coach: Ben Martin (19th season)
- Captains: Mark Kenny; Ken Wood
- Home stadium: Falcon Stadium

1976 NCAA Division I independents football records
	Conf.			Overall
Team	W	L	T	W		L		T
No. 1 Pittsburgh		–		12	–	0	–	0
No. 17 Rutgers		–		11	–	0	–	0
San Diego State		–		10	–	1	–	0
No. 12 Notre Dame		–		9	–	3	–	0
Colgate		–		8	–	2	–	0
Boston College		–		8	–	3	–	0
Cincinnati		–		8	–	3	–	0
Memphis State		–		7	–	4	–	0
North Texas State *		–		7	–	4	–	0
Southern Illinois		–		7	–	4	–	0
Penn State		–		7	–	5	–	0
Villanova		–		6	–	4	–	1
South Carolina		–		6	–	5	–	0
Virginia Tech		–		6	–	5	–	0
Army		–		5	–	6	–	0
Florida State		–		5	–	6	–	0
Illinois State		–		5	–	6	–	0
Richmond		–		5	–	6	–	0
West Virginia		–		5	–	6	–	0
Georgia Tech		–		4	–	6	–	1
Temple		–		4	–	6	–	0
Air Force		–		4	–	7	–	0
Dayton		–		4	–	7	–	0
Louisville		–		4	–	7	–	0
Marshall		–		4	–	7	–	0
Navy		–		4	–	7	–	0
Indiana State		–		3	–	7	–	0
Hawaii		–		3	–	8	–	0
Holy Cross		–		3	–	8	–	0
Miami (FL)		–		3	–	8	–	0
Syracuse		–		3	–	8	–	0
Utah State		–		3	–	8	–	0
Northeast Louisiana		–		2	–	9	–	0
Southern Miss		–		2	–	9	–	0
Tulane		–		2	–	9	–	0
North Texas State (originally 6–5) was awarded a forfeit win after Mississippi State was found to be using an ineligible player.; Rankings from AP Poll

The 1976 Air Force Falcons football team represented the United States Air Force Academy as an independent during the 1976 NCAA Division I football season. Led by 19th-year head coach Ben Martin, the Falcons compiled a record of 4–7 and were outscored by their opponents 273–180. Air Force played their home games at Falcon Stadium in Colorado Springs, Colorado.

== Schedule ==
Date	Opponent	Site	Result	Attendance	Source
September 11	Pacific (CA)	Falcon Stadium; Colorado Springs, CO	W 36–3	21,347	
September 18	Iowa State	Falcon Stadium; Colorado Springs, CO	L 6–41	26,554	
September 25	at No. 5 UCLA	Los Angeles Memorial Coliseum; Los Angeles, CA	L 7–40	37,302	
October 2	vs. Kent State	Municipal Stadium; Cleveland, OH	L 19–24	8,176	
October 9	Navy	Falcon Stadium; Colorado Springs, CO (Commander-in-Chief's Trophy)	W 13–3		
October 16	Colorado State	Falcon Stadium; Colorado Springs, CO (rivalry)	L 3–27	25,363	
October 23	The Citadel	Falcon Stadium; Colorado Springs, CO	L 7–26	29,113	
October 30	at Army	Michie Stadium; West Point, NY (Commander-in-Chief's Trophy)	L 7–24	42,283	
November 6	at Arizona State	Sun Devil Stadium; Tempe, AZ	W 31–30	46,733	
November 13	at Vanderbilt	Dudley Field; Nashville, TN	L 10–34	21,900	
November 20	Wyoming	Falcon Stadium; Colorado Springs, CO	W 41–21	25,736	
Rankings from AP Poll released prior to the game
