= 1976 Gator Bowl =

American college football game

Penn State Nittany Lions	Notre Dame Fighting Irish
(7–4)	(8–3)
Independent	Independent
9	20
Head coach: Joe Paterno	Head coach: Dan Devine
AP / Coaches; 20 / NR	AP / Coaches; 15 / 13
	1	2	3	4	Total
Penn State	3	0	0	6	9
Notre Dame	7	13	0	0	20
- Date: December 27, 1976
- Season: 1976
- Stadium: Gator Bowl Stadium
- Location: Jacksonville, Florida
- MVP: ND: Al Hunter HB; PSU: Jimmy Cefalo WR
- Referee: R. Pete Williams (SEC)
- Attendance: 67,827

United States TV coverage
- Network: ABC

The 1976 Gator Bowl was a college football bowl game played between the Penn State Nittany Lions and the Notre Dame Fighting Irish on December 27, 1976. Notre Dame won the game by a score of 20–9.
