= 1976 Utah State Aggies football team =

American college football season

1976 Utah State Aggies football
- Conference: Independent
- Record: 3–8
- Head coach: Bruce Snyder (1st season)
- Home stadium: Romney Stadium

1976 NCAA Division I independents football records
	Conf.			Overall
Team	W	L	T	W		L		T
No. 1 Pittsburgh		–		12	–	0	–	0
No. 17 Rutgers		–		11	–	0	–	0
San Diego State		–		10	–	1	–	0
No. 12 Notre Dame		–		9	–	3	–	0
Colgate		–		8	–	2	–	0
Boston College		–		8	–	3	–	0
Cincinnati		–		8	–	3	–	0
Memphis State		–		7	–	4	–	0
North Texas State *		–		7	–	4	–	0
Southern Illinois		–		7	–	4	–	0
Penn State		–		7	–	5	–	0
Villanova		–		6	–	4	–	1
South Carolina		–		6	–	5	–	0
Virginia Tech		–		6	–	5	–	0
Army		–		5	–	6	–	0
Florida State		–		5	–	6	–	0
Illinois State		–		5	–	6	–	0
Richmond		–		5	–	6	–	0
West Virginia		–		5	–	6	–	0
Georgia Tech		–		4	–	6	–	1
Temple		–		4	–	6	–	0
Air Force		–		4	–	7	–	0
Dayton		–		4	–	7	–	0
Louisville		–		4	–	7	–	0
Marshall		–		4	–	7	–	0
Navy		–		4	–	7	–	0
Indiana State		–		3	–	7	–	0
Hawaii		–		3	–	8	–	0
Holy Cross		–		3	–	8	–	0
Miami (FL)		–		3	–	8	–	0
Syracuse		–		3	–	8	–	0
Utah State		–		3	–	8	–	0
Northeast Louisiana		–		2	–	9	–	0
Southern Miss		–		2	–	9	–	0
Tulane		–		2	–	9	–	0
North Texas State (originally 6–5) was awarded a forfeit win after Mississippi State was found to be using an ineligible player.; Rankings from AP Poll

The 1976 Utah State Aggies football team was an American football team that represented Utah State University as an independent during the 1976 NCAA Division I football season. In their first season under head coach Bruce Snyder, the Aggies compiled a 3–8 record and were outscored by opponents by a total of 263 to 170.

== Schedule ==
Date	Opponent	Site	Result	Attendance	Source
September 4	at San Jose State	Spartan Stadium; San Jose, CA	L 10–45	19,123	
September 11	at No. 13 Arkansas	War Memorial Stadium; Little Rock, AR	L 16–33	50,536	
September 18	Long Beach State	Romney Stadium; Logan, UT	L 10–32	7,173	
September 25	at Wyoming	War Memorial Stadium; Laramie, WY (rivalry)	L 3–20	19,574	
October 2	at Oregon	Autzen Stadium; Eugene, OR	L 9–27	17,300	
October 9	Colorado State	Romney Stadium; Logan, UT	L 7–10	7,868	
October 16	Utah	Romney Stadium; Logan, UT (rivalry)	W 28–17	18,322	
October 23	at BYU	Cougar Stadium; Provo, UT (rivalry)	L 14–45	24,124	
October 30	Weber State	Romney Stadium; Logan, UT	W 36–10	6,441	
November 13	at San Diego State	San Diego Stadium; San Diego, CA	L 6–7	29,037	
November 20	Pacific (CA)	Romney Stadium; Logan, UT	W 31–17	11,075	
Rankings from Coaches' Poll released prior to the game
