= 1976 Maine Black Bears football team =

American college football season

1976 Maine Black Bears football
- Conference: Yankee Conference
- Record: 6–5 (2–3 Yankee)
- Head coach: Jack Bicknell (1st season)
- Captains: Scott E. Shulman; Jack Leggett; Gerard Tautkus
- Home stadium: Alumni Field

1976 Yankee Conference football standings
	Conf.					Overall
Team	W		L		T	W		L		T
No. T–8 New Hampshire $^	4	–	1	–	0	8	–	3	–	0
UMass	3	–	2	–	0	5	–	5	–	0
Maine	2	–	3	–	0	6	–	5	–	0
Rhode Island	2	–	3	–	0	3	–	5	–	0
Boston University	2	–	3	–	0	3	–	7	–	0
Connecticut	2	–	3	–	0	2	–	9	–	0
$ – Conference champion; ^ – NCAA Division II playoff participant; Rankings from Associated Press poll

The 1976 Maine Black Bears football team was an American football team that represented the University of Maine as a member of the Yankee Conference during the 1976 NCAA Division II football season. In its first season under head coach Jack Bicknell, the team compiled a 6–5 record (2–3 against conference opponents) and finished in a four-way tie for last place in the Yankee Conference. Scott E. Shulman, Jack Leggett, and Gerard Tautkus were the team captains.

== Schedule ==
Date	Opponent	Site	Result	Attendance	Source
September 11	Saint Mary's (NS)*	Alumni Field; Orono, ME	W 49–14	4,800	
September 18	UMass	Alumni Field; Orono, ME	L 3–24	7,100	
September 25	Central Connecticut State*	Alumni Field; Orono, ME	W 17–3	5,800	
October 2	Rhode Island	Alumni Field; Orono, ME	L 9–14	7,500	
October 9	at New Hampshire	Cowell Stadium; Durham, NH	W 10–0	8,200–8,250	
October 16	at Connecticut	Memorial Stadium; Storrs, CT	W 24–13	8,151–8,200	
October 23	Lehigh*	Alumni Field; Orono, ME	L 0–24	7,600	
October 30	at Southern Connecticut*	New Haven, CT	W 24–14	5,600	
November 6	Northeastern*	Alumni Field; Orono, ME	W 21–20	4,000	
November 13	at Boston University*	Nickerson Field; Boston, MA	L 14–28	2,656–2,700	
November 20	at No. 4 Delaware*	Delaware Stadium; Newark, DE	L 0–36	14,100–14,136	
*Non-conference game; Rankings from AP Poll released prior to the game
