= 1976 West Virginia Mountaineers football team =

American college football season

1976 West Virginia Mountaineers football
- Conference: Independent
- Record: 5–6
- Head coach: Frank Cignetti Sr. (1st season)
- Offensive coordinator: Joe Pendry (1st season)
- Home stadium: Mountaineer Field

1976 NCAA Division I independents football records
	Conf.			Overall
Team	W	L	T	W		L		T
No. 1 Pittsburgh		–		12	–	0	–	0
No. 17 Rutgers		–		11	–	0	–	0
San Diego State		–		10	–	1	–	0
No. 12 Notre Dame		–		9	–	3	–	0
Colgate		–		8	–	2	–	0
Boston College		–		8	–	3	–	0
Cincinnati		–		8	–	3	–	0
Memphis State		–		7	–	4	–	0
North Texas State *		–		7	–	4	–	0
Southern Illinois		–		7	–	4	–	0
Penn State		–		7	–	5	–	0
Villanova		–		6	–	4	–	1
South Carolina		–		6	–	5	–	0
Virginia Tech		–		6	–	5	–	0
Army		–		5	–	6	–	0
Florida State		–		5	–	6	–	0
Illinois State		–		5	–	6	–	0
Richmond		–		5	–	6	–	0
West Virginia		–		5	–	6	–	0
Georgia Tech		–		4	–	6	–	1
Temple		–		4	–	6	–	0
Air Force		–		4	–	7	–	0
Dayton		–		4	–	7	–	0
Louisville		–		4	–	7	–	0
Marshall		–		4	–	7	–	0
Navy		–		4	–	7	–	0
Indiana State		–		3	–	7	–	0
Hawaii		–		3	–	8	–	0
Holy Cross		–		3	–	8	–	0
Miami (FL)		–		3	–	8	–	0
Syracuse		–		3	–	8	–	0
Utah State		–		3	–	8	–	0
Northeast Louisiana		–		2	–	9	–	0
Southern Miss		–		2	–	9	–	0
Tulane		–		2	–	9	–	0
North Texas State (originally 6–5) was awarded a forfeit win after Mississippi State was found to be using an ineligible player.; Rankings from AP Poll

The 1976 West Virginia Mountaineers football team represented West Virginia University in the 1976 NCAA Division I football season. It was the Mountaineers' 84th overall season and they competed as an independent. The team was led by head coach Frank Cignetti Sr., in his first year, and played their home games at Mountaineer Field in Morgantown, West Virginia. They finished the season with a record 5–6.

== Schedule ==
Date	Opponent	Site	Result	Attendance	Source
September 11	Villanova	Mountaineer Field; Morgantown, WV	W 28–7	33,784	
September 18	No. 10 Maryland	Mountaineer Field; Morgantown, WV (rivalry)	L 3–24	35,107	
September 25	at Kentucky	Commonwealth Stadium; Lexington, KY	L 10–14	57,703	
October 2	Richmond	Mountaineer Field; Morgantown, WV	W 9–6	30,437	
October 9	at Temple	Franklin Field; Philadelphia, PA	W 42–0	3,777	
October 16	at Boston College	Alumni Stadium; Chestnut Hill, MA	L 3–14	23,501	
October 23	No. 10 Penn State^{†}	Mountaineer Field; Morgantown, WV (rivalry)	L 0–33	37,672	
October 30	at Virginia Tech	Lane Stadium; Blacksburg, VA (rivalry)	L 7–24	39,000	
November 6	at Tulane	Louisiana Superdome; New Orleans, LA	W 32–28	29,237	
November 13	at No. 1 Pittsburgh	Pitt Stadium; Pittsburgh, PA (rivalry)	L 16–24	56,500	
November 20	Syracuse	Mountaineer Field; Morgantown, WV (rivalry)	W 34–28	27,848	
^{†}Homecoming; Rankings from AP Poll released prior to the game

== Roster ==
1976 West Virginia Mountaineers football team roster
Players
Coaches
Offense

Pos.	#	Name	Class
QB	2	Dan Kendra	Jr
WR		Tommy Bowden

Defense

Pos.	#	Name	Class
DB	22	Tom Pridemore	Jr

Special teams

Pos.	#	Name	Class

Head coach

- Frank Cignetti

Coordinators/assistant coaches

Legend

- (C) Team captain
- (S) Suspended
- (I) Ineligible
- Injured
- Redshirt
