= 1976 Northeast Louisiana Indians football team =

American college football season

1976 Northeast Louisiana Indians football
- Conference: Independent
- Record: 2–9
- Head coach: John David Crow (1st season)
- Home stadium: Brown Stadium

1976 NCAA Division I independents football records
	Conf.			Overall
Team	W	L	T	W		L		T
No. 1 Pittsburgh		–		12	–	0	–	0
No. 17 Rutgers		–		11	–	0	–	0
San Diego State		–		10	–	1	–	0
No. 12 Notre Dame		–		9	–	3	–	0
Colgate		–		8	–	2	–	0
Boston College		–		8	–	3	–	0
Cincinnati		–		8	–	3	–	0
Memphis State		–		7	–	4	–	0
North Texas State *		–		7	–	4	–	0
Southern Illinois		–		7	–	4	–	0
Penn State		–		7	–	5	–	0
Villanova		–		6	–	4	–	1
South Carolina		–		6	–	5	–	0
Virginia Tech		–		6	–	5	–	0
Army		–		5	–	6	–	0
Florida State		–		5	–	6	–	0
Illinois State		–		5	–	6	–	0
Richmond		–		5	–	6	–	0
West Virginia		–		5	–	6	–	0
Georgia Tech		–		4	–	6	–	1
Temple		–		4	–	6	–	0
Air Force		–		4	–	7	–	0
Dayton		–		4	–	7	–	0
Louisville		–		4	–	7	–	0
Marshall		–		4	–	7	–	0
Navy		–		4	–	7	–	0
Indiana State		–		3	–	7	–	0
Hawaii		–		3	–	8	–	0
Holy Cross		–		3	–	8	–	0
Miami (FL)		–		3	–	8	–	0
Syracuse		–		3	–	8	–	0
Utah State		–		3	–	8	–	0
Northeast Louisiana		–		2	–	9	–	0
Southern Miss		–		2	–	9	–	0
Tulane		–		2	–	9	–	0
North Texas State (originally 6–5) was awarded a forfeit win after Mississippi State was found to be using an ineligible player.; Rankings from AP Poll

The 1976 Northeast Louisiana Indians football team was an American football team that represented Northeast Louisiana University (now known as the University of Louisiana at Monroe) as an independent during the 1976 NCAA Division I football season. In their first year under head coach John David Crow, the team compiled a 2–9 record.

== Schedule ==
Date	Opponent	Site	Result	Attendance	Source
September 4	at Arkansas State	Indian Stadium; Jonesboro, AR	L 13–31		
September 18	Lamar	Brown Stadium; Monroe, LA	W 16–6		
September 25	UT Arlington	Brown Stadium; Monroe, LA	W 21–20	8,100	
October 9	McNeese State	Brown Stadium; Monroe, LA	L 35–36		
October 16	at Louisville	Fairgrounds Stadium; Louisville, KY	L 8–36	14,069	
October 23	at Southeastern Louisiana	Strawberry Stadium; Hammond, LA	L 10–14		
October 30	Northwestern State	Brown Stadium; Monroe, LA (rivalry)	L 9–21		
November 6	Dayton	Brown Stadium; Monroe, LA	L 13–37		
November 13	at West Texas State	Kimbrough Memorial Stadium; Canyon, TX	L 41–58		
November 20	Louisiana Tech	Brown Stadium; Monroe, LA (rivalry)	L 35–55		
December 4	at Southwestern Louisiana	Cajun Field; Lafayette, LA	L 5–7	19,315	
