= 1976 Miami Hurricanes football team =

American college football season

1976 Miami Hurricanes football
- Conference: Independent
- Record: 3–8
- Head coach: Carl Selmer (2nd season)
- MVP: Eddie Edwards
- Home stadium: Miami Orange Bowl

1976 NCAA Division I independents football records
	Conf.			Overall
Team	W	L	T	W		L		T
No. 1 Pittsburgh		–		12	–	0	–	0
No. 17 Rutgers		–		11	–	0	–	0
San Diego State		–		10	–	1	–	0
No. 12 Notre Dame		–		9	–	3	–	0
Colgate		–		8	–	2	–	0
Boston College		–		8	–	3	–	0
Cincinnati		–		8	–	3	–	0
Memphis State		–		7	–	4	–	0
North Texas State *		–		7	–	4	–	0
Southern Illinois		–		7	–	4	–	0
Penn State		–		7	–	5	–	0
Villanova		–		6	–	4	–	1
South Carolina		–		6	–	5	–	0
Virginia Tech		–		6	–	5	–	0
Army		–		5	–	6	–	0
Florida State		–		5	–	6	–	0
Illinois State		–		5	–	6	–	0
Richmond		–		5	–	6	–	0
West Virginia		–		5	–	6	–	0
Georgia Tech		–		4	–	6	–	1
Temple		–		4	–	6	–	0
Air Force		–		4	–	7	–	0
Dayton		–		4	–	7	–	0
Louisville		–		4	–	7	–	0
Marshall		–		4	–	7	–	0
Navy		–		4	–	7	–	0
Indiana State		–		3	–	7	–	0
Hawaii		–		3	–	8	–	0
Holy Cross		–		3	–	8	–	0
Miami (FL)		–		3	–	8	–	0
Syracuse		–		3	–	8	–	0
Utah State		–		3	–	8	–	0
Northeast Louisiana		–		2	–	9	–	0
Southern Miss		–		2	–	9	–	0
Tulane		–		2	–	9	–	0
North Texas State (originally 6–5) was awarded a forfeit win after Mississippi State was found to be using an ineligible player.; Rankings from AP Poll

The 1976 Miami Hurricanes football team represented the University of Miami as an independent during the 1976 NCAA Division I football season. Led by Carl Selmer in his second and final year as head coach, the Hurricanes played their home games at the Miami Orange Bowl in Miami, Florida. Miami finished the season with a record of 3–8.

== Schedule ==
Date	Opponent	Site	Result	Attendance	Source
September 18	Florida State	Miami Orange Bowl; Miami, FL (rivalry)	W 47–0	22,710	
September 25	at Colorado	Folsom Field; Boulder, CO	L 3–33	48,882	
October 2	at No. 5 Nebraska	Memorial Stadium; Lincoln, NE (rivalry)	L 9–17	76,155	
October 9	Duke	Miami Orange Bowl; Miami, FL	L 7–20	13,811–13,818	
October 16	at No. 2 Pittsburgh	Pitt Stadium; Pittsburgh, PA	L 19–36	42,434	
October 23	TCU	Miami Orange Bowl; Miami, FL	W 49–0	10,539–10,779	
November 6	Boston College	Miami Orange Bowl; Miami, FL	W 13–6	14,766	
November 13	Penn State	Miami Orange Bowl; Miami, FL	L 7–21	19,627	
November 20	at No. 13 Notre Dame	Notre Dame Stadium; Notre Dame, IN (rivalry)	L 27–40	59,075	
November 27	vs. Florida	Citrus Bowl; Orlando, FL (rivalry)	L 10–19	40,055	
December 4	at No. 6 Houston	Houston Astrodome; Houston, TX	L 16–21	20,849	
Rankings from AP Poll released prior to the game
