= 1976 Temple Owls football team =

American college football season

1976 Temple Owls football
- Conference: Independent
- Record: 4–6
- Head coach: Wayne Hardin (7th season)
- Home stadium: Veterans Stadium, Franklin Field

1976 NCAA Division I independents football records
	Conf.			Overall
Team	W	L	T	W		L		T
No. 1 Pittsburgh		–		12	–	0	–	0
No. 17 Rutgers		–		11	–	0	–	0
San Diego State		–		10	–	1	–	0
No. 12 Notre Dame		–		9	–	3	–	0
Colgate		–		8	–	2	–	0
Boston College		–		8	–	3	–	0
Cincinnati		–		8	–	3	–	0
Memphis State		–		7	–	4	–	0
North Texas State *		–		7	–	4	–	0
Southern Illinois		–		7	–	4	–	0
Penn State		–		7	–	5	–	0
Villanova		–		6	–	4	–	1
South Carolina		–		6	–	5	–	0
Virginia Tech		–		6	–	5	–	0
Army		–		5	–	6	–	0
Florida State		–		5	–	6	–	0
Illinois State		–		5	–	6	–	0
Richmond		–		5	–	6	–	0
West Virginia		–		5	–	6	–	0
Georgia Tech		–		4	–	6	–	1
Temple		–		4	–	6	–	0
Air Force		–		4	–	7	–	0
Dayton		–		4	–	7	–	0
Louisville		–		4	–	7	–	0
Marshall		–		4	–	7	–	0
Navy		–		4	–	7	–	0
Indiana State		–		3	–	7	–	0
Hawaii		–		3	–	8	–	0
Holy Cross		–		3	–	8	–	0
Miami (FL)		–		3	–	8	–	0
Syracuse		–		3	–	8	–	0
Utah State		–		3	–	8	–	0
Northeast Louisiana		–		2	–	9	–	0
Southern Miss		–		2	–	9	–	0
Tulane		–		2	–	9	–	0
North Texas State (originally 6–5) was awarded a forfeit win after Mississippi State was found to be using an ineligible player.; Rankings from AP Poll

The 1976 Temple Owls football team was an American football team that represented Temple University as an independent during the 1976 NCAA Division I football season. In its seventh season under head coach Wayne Hardin, the team compiled a 4–6 record and was outscored by a total of 216 to 196. The team played its home games at Veterans Stadium (three games) and Franklin Field (two games) in Philadelphia.

The team's statistical leaders included Pat Carey with 839 passing yards, Anthony Anderson with 803 rushing yards, and Ken Williams with 580 receiving yards and 36 points scored.

== Schedule ==
Date	Opponent	Site	Result	Attendance	Source
September 11	at Akron	Rubber Bowl; Akron, OH	W 23–13	33,158	
September 18	Grambling State	Veterans Stadium; Philadelphia, PA	W 31–30	16,646	
September 25	at No. 3 Pittsburgh	Pitt Stadium; Pittsburgh, PA	L 7–21	38,500	
October 2	Delaware	Franklin Field; Philadelphia, PA	L 16–18	15,861	
October 9	West Virginia	Franklin Field; Philadelphia, PA	L 0–42	8,095	
October 23	at Syracuse	Archbold Stadium; Syracuse, NY	L 16–24	19,152	
October 30	Penn State	Veterans Stadium; Philadelphia, PA	L 30–31	42,005	
November 6	at Drake	Drake Stadium; Des Moines, IA	W 31–7	7,245	
November 13	Dayton	Veterans Stadium; Philadelphia, PA	W 35–6	7,429	
November 20	Villanova	Veterans Stadium; Philadelphia, PA (Mayor's Cup)	L 7–24	17,436	
Rankings from AP Poll released prior to the game

== Roster ==
1976 Temple Owls football team roster
Players
Coaches
Offense

Pos.	#	Name	Class
RB	25	Anthony Anderson	So
QB	7	Bob Baker	Jr
QB	12	Brian Broomell	Fr
OT	70	Jim Cooper	Sr
RB	28	Zachary Dixon	So
WR	84	Steve Watson	So

Defense

Pos.	#	Name	Class
LB	54	Mike Curcio	Fr
DT	72	Joe Klecko	Sr

Special teams

Pos.	#	Name	Class
K	1	Frank Mike-Meyer	Jr

Head coach

- Wayne Hardin

Coordinators/assistant coaches

Legend

- (C) Team captain
- (S) Suspended
- (I) Ineligible
- Injured
- Redshirt
