= 1976 Colgate Red Raiders football team =

American college football season

1976 Colgate Red Raiders football
- Conference: Independent
- Record: 8–2
- Head coach: Frederick Dunlap (1st season)
- Captains: Mark Murphy; Keith Polito
- Home stadium: Andy Kerr Stadium

1976 NCAA Division I independents football records
	Conf.			Overall
Team	W	L	T	W		L		T
No. 1 Pittsburgh		–		12	–	0	–	0
No. 17 Rutgers		–		11	–	0	–	0
San Diego State		–		10	–	1	–	0
No. 12 Notre Dame		–		9	–	3	–	0
Colgate		–		8	–	2	–	0
Boston College		–		8	–	3	–	0
Cincinnati		–		8	–	3	–	0
Memphis State		–		7	–	4	–	0
North Texas State *		–		7	–	4	–	0
Southern Illinois		–		7	–	4	–	0
Penn State		–		7	–	5	–	0
Villanova		–		6	–	4	–	1
South Carolina		–		6	–	5	–	0
Virginia Tech		–		6	–	5	–	0
Army		–		5	–	6	–	0
Florida State		–		5	–	6	–	0
Illinois State		–		5	–	6	–	0
Richmond		–		5	–	6	–	0
West Virginia		–		5	–	6	–	0
Georgia Tech		–		4	–	6	–	1
Temple		–		4	–	6	–	0
Air Force		–		4	–	7	–	0
Dayton		–		4	–	7	–	0
Louisville		–		4	–	7	–	0
Marshall		–		4	–	7	–	0
Navy		–		4	–	7	–	0
Indiana State		–		3	–	7	–	0
Hawaii		–		3	–	8	–	0
Holy Cross		–		3	–	8	–	0
Miami (FL)		–		3	–	8	–	0
Syracuse		–		3	–	8	–	0
Utah State		–		3	–	8	–	0
Northeast Louisiana		–		2	–	9	–	0
Southern Miss		–		2	–	9	–	0
Tulane		–		2	–	9	–	0
North Texas State (originally 6–5) was awarded a forfeit win after Mississippi State was found to be using an ineligible player.; Rankings from AP Poll

The 1976 Colgate Red Raiders football team was an American football team that represented Colgate University as an independent during the 1976 NCAA Division I football season. In its first season under head coach Frederick Dunlap, the team compiled an 8–2 record. Mark Murphy and Keith Polito were the team captains.

The team played its home games at Andy Kerr Stadium in Hamilton, New York.

== Schedule ==
Date	Opponent	Site	Result	Attendance	Source
September 11	Connecticut	Andy Kerr Stadium; Hamilton, NY	W 13–7	5,000–5,300	
September 18	at Davidson	Richardson Stadium; Davidson, NC	W 17–7	3,500	
September 25	at Cornell	Schoellkopf Field; Ithaca, NY (rivalry)	W 25–20	10,000	
October 9	Holy Cross	Andy Kerr Stadium; Hamilton, NY	W 10–6	3,000	
October 16	at Princeton	Palmer Stadium; Princeton, NJ	W 17–7	18,000	
October 23	at Lafayette	Fisher Field; Easton, PA	W 24–14	3,000	
October 30	Boston University	Andy Kerr Stadium; Hamilton, NY	W 21–14	3,500–5,000	
November 6	at Bucknell	Memorial Stadium; Lewisburg, PA	W 24–13	3,500	
November 13	at Army	Michie Stadium; West Point, NY	L 13–29	29,637	
November 25	at No. 17 Rutgers	Giants Stadium; East Rutherford, NJ	L 9–17	33,405	
Rankings from AP Poll released prior to the game

== Leading players ==
Two trophies were awarded to the Red Raiders' most valuable players in 1976:

- Keith Polito, wide receiver, received the Andy Kerr Trophy, awarded to the most valuable offensive player.
- Doug Curtis, linebacker, received the Hal W. Lahar Trophy, awarded to the most valuable defensive player.

Statistical leaders for the 1976 Red Raiders included:

- Rushing: Pat Healy, 557 yards and 3 touchdowns on 141 attempts
- Passing: Bob Relph, 1,353 yards, 95 completions and 10 touchdowns on 201 attempts
- Receiving: Keith Polito, 555 yards and 6 touchdowns on 30 receptions
- Total offense: Bob Relph, 1,530 yards (1,353 passing, 177 rushing)
- Scoring: Jerry Andrewlavage, 51 points from 15 PATs and 12 field goals
- All-purpose yards: Bruce Malverty, 859 yards (418 rushing, 281 kickoff returning, 160 receiving)
- Tackles: Doug Curtis, 145 total tackles
- Sacks: Sid Harris, 6 quarterback sacks
