= 1976 Boston College Eagles football team =

American college football season

1976 Boston College Eagles football
- Conference: Independent
- Record: 8–3
- Head coach: Joe Yukica (9th season)
- Captain: Peter Cronan
- Home stadium: Alumni Stadium

1976 NCAA Division I independents football records
	Conf.			Overall
Team	W	L	T	W		L		T
No. 1 Pittsburgh		–		12	–	0	–	0
No. 17 Rutgers		–		11	–	0	–	0
San Diego State		–		10	–	1	–	0
No. 12 Notre Dame		–		9	–	3	–	0
Colgate		–		8	–	2	–	0
Boston College		–		8	–	3	–	0
Cincinnati		–		8	–	3	–	0
Memphis State		–		7	–	4	–	0
North Texas State *		–		7	–	4	–	0
Southern Illinois		–		7	–	4	–	0
Penn State		–		7	–	5	–	0
Villanova		–		6	–	4	–	1
South Carolina		–		6	–	5	–	0
Virginia Tech		–		6	–	5	–	0
Army		–		5	–	6	–	0
Florida State		–		5	–	6	–	0
Illinois State		–		5	–	6	–	0
Richmond		–		5	–	6	–	0
West Virginia		–		5	–	6	–	0
Georgia Tech		–		4	–	6	–	1
Temple		–		4	–	6	–	0
Air Force		–		4	–	7	–	0
Dayton		–		4	–	7	–	0
Louisville		–		4	–	7	–	0
Marshall		–		4	–	7	–	0
Navy		–		4	–	7	–	0
Indiana State		–		3	–	7	–	0
Hawaii		–		3	–	8	–	0
Holy Cross		–		3	–	8	–	0
Miami (FL)		–		3	–	8	–	0
Syracuse		–		3	–	8	–	0
Utah State		–		3	–	8	–	0
Northeast Louisiana		–		2	–	9	–	0
Southern Miss		–		2	–	9	–	0
Tulane		–		2	–	9	–	0
North Texas State (originally 6–5) was awarded a forfeit win after Mississippi State was found to be using an ineligible player.; Rankings from AP Poll

The 1976 Boston College Eagles football team represented Boston College as an independent during the 1976 NCAA Division I football season. Led by ninth-year head coach Joe Yukica, the Eagles compiled a record of 8–3. Boston College opened the year with an upset win over No. 7 Texas, but accumulated three losses to unranked teams and failed to be invited to a bowl game. The team played home games at Alumni Stadium in Chestnut Hill, Massachusetts.

== Schedule ==
Date	Opponent	Rank	Site	Result	Attendance	Source
September 11	No. 7 Texas		Alumni Stadium; Chestnut Hill, MA	W 14–13	30,476	
September 25	at Tulane	No. 18	Louisiana Superdome; New Orleans, LA	W 27–3	20,235	
October 2	at Navy	No. 15	Navy–Marine Corps Memorial Stadium; Annapolis, MD	W 17–13	16,156	
October 9	Florida State	No. 13	Alumni Stadium; Chestnut Hill, MA	L 9–28	22,866	
October 16	West Virginia		Alumni Stadium; Chestnut Hill, MA	W 14–3	23,501	
October 23	at Army		Michie Stadium; West Point, NY	W 27–10	32,008	
October 30	at Villanova		Villanova Stadium; Villanova, PA	L 3–22	8,200	
November 6	at Miami (FL)		Miami Orange Bowl; Miami, FL	L 6–13	14,766	
November 13	Syracuse		Alumni Stadium; Chestnut Hill, MA	W 28–14	25,433	
November 20	at UMass		Warren McGuirk Alumni Stadium; Hadley, MA (rivalry)	W 35–0	13,300	
November 27	Holy Cross		Alumni Stadium; Chestnut Hill, MA (rivalry)	W 59–6	25,988	
Rankings from AP Poll released prior to the game
