= 1976 New Hampshire Wildcats football team =

American college football season

1976 New Hampshire Wildcats football

Yankee Conference champion

NCAA Division II Quarterfinal, L 16–17 at Montana State
- Conference: Yankee Conference

Ranking
- AP: No. T-8
- Record: 8–3 (4–1 Yankee)
- Head coach: Bill Bowes (5th season)
- Home stadium: Cowell Stadium

1976 Yankee Conference football standings
	Conf.					Overall
Team	W		L		T	W		L		T
No. T–8 New Hampshire $^	4	–	1	–	0	8	–	3	–	0
UMass	3	–	2	–	0	5	–	5	–	0
Maine	2	–	3	–	0	6	–	5	–	0
Rhode Island	2	–	3	–	0	3	–	5	–	0
Boston University	2	–	3	–	0	3	–	7	–	0
Connecticut	2	–	3	–	0	2	–	9	–	0
$ – Conference champion; ^ – NCAA Division II playoff participant; Rankings from Associated Press poll

The 1976 New Hampshire Wildcats football team was an American football team that represented the University of New Hampshire as a member of the Yankee Conference during the 1976 NCAA Division II football season. In its fifth year under head coach Bill Bowes, the team compiled an 8–3 record (4–1 against conference opponents), won the Yankee Conference championship, and lost to eventual national champion Montana State in the quarterfinal of the NCAA Division II Football Championship playoffs.

== Schedule ==
Date	Opponent	Rank	Site	Result	Attendance	Source
September 11	at Holy Cross*		Fitton Field; Worcester, MA	W 17–3	12,551	
September 18	Boston University		Cowell Stadium; Durham, NH	W 13–0	11,570	
September 25	at Dartmouth*	No. 4	Memorial Field; Hanover, NH	L 14–24	13,650	
October 2	Connecticut		Cowell Stadium; Durham, NH	W 24–21	10,450	
October 9	Maine		Cowell Stadium; Durham, NH (Battle for the Brice–Cowell Musket)	L 0–10	8,200–8,250	
October 16	at Central Connecticut*		New Britain, CT	W 34–21	5,300	
October 23	at Northeastern*		Brookline, MA	W 35–21	5,039	
October 30	at West Chester		West Chester, PA	W 27–10	4,000	
November 6	Rhode Island		Cowell Stadium; Durham, NH	W 31–6	11,200–11,500	
November 13	at UMass		Alumni Stadium; Hadley, MA (rivalry)	W 23–0	10,900	
November 27	at No. 1 Montana State*	No. T–8	Reno H. Sales Stadium; Bozeman, MT (NCAA Division II Quarterfinal)	L 16–17	6,900	
*Non-conference game; Rankings from AP Poll released prior to the game

== Roster ==
1976 New Hampshire Wildcats football team roster
Players			Coaches
Offense: Pos. / # / Name / Class	Defense: Pos. / # / Name / Class; LB / / Bruce Huther / Sr	Special teams: Pos. / # / Name / Class	Head coach: Bill Bowes; Coordinators/assistant coaches Legend: (C) Team captain; (S) Suspended; (I) Ineligible; Injured; Redshirt
