= 1976 San Diego State Aztecs football team =

American college football season

1976 San Diego State Aztecs football
- Conference: Independent
- Record: 10–1
- Head coach: Claude Gilbert (4th season)
- Offensive coordinator: Ted Tollner (4th season)
- Offensive scheme: Pro-style
- Base defense: 4–3
- Home stadium: San Diego Stadium

1976 NCAA Division I independents football records
	Conf.			Overall
Team	W	L	T	W		L		T
No. 1 Pittsburgh		–		12	–	0	–	0
No. 17 Rutgers		–		11	–	0	–	0
San Diego State		–		10	–	1	–	0
No. 12 Notre Dame		–		9	–	3	–	0
Colgate		–		8	–	2	–	0
Boston College		–		8	–	3	–	0
Cincinnati		–		8	–	3	–	0
Memphis State		–		7	–	4	–	0
North Texas State *		–		7	–	4	–	0
Southern Illinois		–		7	–	4	–	0
Penn State		–		7	–	5	–	0
Villanova		–		6	–	4	–	1
South Carolina		–		6	–	5	–	0
Virginia Tech		–		6	–	5	–	0
Army		–		5	–	6	–	0
Florida State		–		5	–	6	–	0
Illinois State		–		5	–	6	–	0
Richmond		–		5	–	6	–	0
West Virginia		–		5	–	6	–	0
Georgia Tech		–		4	–	6	–	1
Temple		–		4	–	6	–	0
Air Force		–		4	–	7	–	0
Dayton		–		4	–	7	–	0
Louisville		–		4	–	7	–	0
Marshall		–		4	–	7	–	0
Navy		–		4	–	7	–	0
Indiana State		–		3	–	7	–	0
Hawaii		–		3	–	8	–	0
Holy Cross		–		3	–	8	–	0
Miami (FL)		–		3	–	8	–	0
Syracuse		–		3	–	8	–	0
Utah State		–		3	–	8	–	0
Northeast Louisiana		–		2	–	9	–	0
Southern Miss		–		2	–	9	–	0
Tulane		–		2	–	9	–	0
North Texas State (originally 6–5) was awarded a forfeit win after Mississippi State was found to be using an ineligible player.; Rankings from AP Poll

The 1976 San Diego State Aztecs football team represented San Diego State University during the 1976 NCAA Division I football season as an independent. They had been a member of the Pacific Coast Athletic Association (Note: The Big West Conference was known as the Pacific Coast Athletic Association from its founding in 1969 through 1987.) for the previous seven years.

The team was led by head coach Claude Gilbert, in his fourth year, and played home games at San Diego Stadium (Note: San Diego County Credit Union Stadium (SDCCU Stadium) was known as San Diego Stadium from its opening in 1967 through 1980.) in San Diego, California. They finished the season with a record of ten wins and one loss (10–1).

== Schedule ==
Date	Opponent	Site	Result	Attendance	Source
September 12	Arkansas State	San Diego Stadium; San Diego, CA	W 24–14	36,791	
September 18	Fresno State	San Diego Stadium; San Diego, CA (rivalry)	W 7–3	40,768	
September 25	at Bowling Green	Doyt Perry Stadium; Bowling Green, OH	W 27–15	11,673	
October 2	BYU	San Diego Stadium; San Diego, CA	L 0–8	41,786	
October 16	Pacific (CA)	San Diego Stadium; San Diego, CA	W 21–15	31,045	
October 23	Cal State Fullerton	San Diego Stadium; San Diego, CA	W 27–14	31,225	
October 30	at UTEP	Sun Bowl; El Paso, TX	W 27–16	9,500	
November 6	San Jose State^{†}	San Diego Stadium; San Diego, CA	W 30–17	40,710	
November 13	Utah State	San Diego Stadium; San Diego, CA	W 7–6	29,037	
November 20	at Long Beach State	Veterans Stadium; Long Beach, CA	W 10–3	14,900	
November 27	New Mexico	San Diego Stadium; San Diego, CA	W 17–14	27,526	
^{†}Homecoming

== Team players in the NFL ==
The following were selected in the 1977 NFL draft.

Player	Position	Round	Overall	NFL team
Bill Helms	Tight End	11	284	New York Giants

The following finished their college career in 1976, were not drafted, but played in the NFL.

Player	Position	First NFL Team
Herm Edwards	Defensive Back	1977 Philadelphia Eagles

== Team awards ==
Award	Player
Most Valuable Player (John Simcox Memorial Trophy)	Travis Hitt
Outstanding Offensive & Defensive Linemen (Byron H. Chase Memorial Trophy)	Mike Solari, Off; Dave Johnston; Ed Imo, Def
Team captains Dr. R. Hardy / C.E. Peterson Memorial Trophy	Tom Craft, Off; Travis Hitt, Def
Most Inspirational Player	Tim Delaney, Herm Edwards
