= 1976 Louisville Cardinals football team =

American college football season

1976 Louisville Cardinals football
- Conference: Independent
- Record: 5–6
- Head coach: Vince Gibson (2nd season)
- Home stadium: Fairgrounds Stadium

1976 NCAA Division I independents football records
	Conf.			Overall
Team	W	L	T	W		L		T
No. 1 Pittsburgh		–		12	–	0	–	0
No. 17 Rutgers		–		11	–	0	–	0
San Diego State		–		10	–	1	–	0
No. 12 Notre Dame		–		9	–	3	–	0
Colgate		–		8	–	2	–	0
Boston College		–		8	–	3	–	0
Cincinnati		–		8	–	3	–	0
Memphis State		–		7	–	4	–	0
North Texas State *		–		7	–	4	–	0
Southern Illinois		–		7	–	4	–	0
Penn State		–		7	–	5	–	0
Villanova		–		6	–	4	–	1
South Carolina		–		6	–	5	–	0
Virginia Tech		–		6	–	5	–	0
Army		–		5	–	6	–	0
Florida State		–		5	–	6	–	0
Illinois State		–		5	–	6	–	0
Richmond		–		5	–	6	–	0
West Virginia		–		5	–	6	–	0
Georgia Tech		–		4	–	6	–	1
Temple		–		4	–	6	–	0
Air Force		–		4	–	7	–	0
Dayton		–		4	–	7	–	0
Louisville		–		4	–	7	–	0
Marshall		–		4	–	7	–	0
Navy		–		4	–	7	–	0
Indiana State		–		3	–	7	–	0
Hawaii		–		3	–	8	–	0
Holy Cross		–		3	–	8	–	0
Miami (FL)		–		3	–	8	–	0
Syracuse		–		3	–	8	–	0
Utah State		–		3	–	8	–	0
Northeast Louisiana		–		2	–	9	–	0
Southern Miss		–		2	–	9	–	0
Tulane		–		2	–	9	–	0
North Texas State (originally 6–5) was awarded a forfeit win after Mississippi State was found to be using an ineligible player.; Rankings from AP Poll

The 1976 Louisville Cardinals football team was an American football team that represented the University of Louisville as an independent during the 1976 NCAA Division I football season. In their second season under head coach Vince Gibson, the Cardinals compiled a 4–7 record and were outscored by a total of 234 to 177.

The team's statistical leaders included Stu Stram with 394 passing yards, Calvin Prince with 1,028 rushing yards and 60 points scored, and Ebb Williams with 165 receiving yards.

== Schedule ==
Date	Opponent	Site	Result	Attendance	Source
September 18	at Mississippi State	Scott Field; Starkville, MS	W 21–30 (Miss. State forfeit)	27,000	
September 25	Drake	Fairgrounds Stadium; Louisville, KY	W 37–24	16,009	
October 2	Wichita State	Fairgrounds Stadium; Louisville, KY	W 28–14	16,541	
October 9	at No. 2 Pittsburgh	Pitt Stadium; Pittsburgh, PA	L 6–27	34,000	
October 16	Northeast Louisiana	Fairgrounds Stadium; Louisville, KY	W 36–8	14,069	
October 23	at No. 18 Alabama	Bryant–Denny Stadium; Tuscaloosa, AL	L 3–24	58,414	
October 30	Tulsa	Fairgrounds Stadium; Louisville, KY	L 10–20	8,068	
November 6	at Rutgers	Rutgers Stadium; Piscataway, NJ	L 0–34	16,000	
November 13	Memphis State	Fairgrounds Stadium; Louisville, KY (rivalry)	L 14–26	9,943	
November 20	Boston University	Fairgrounds Stadium; Louisville, KY	W 16–7	7,713	
November 27	at Cincinnati	Nippert Stadium; Cincinnati, OH (The Keg of Nails)	L 6–20	7,597	
Rankings from AP Poll released prior to the game
