= 1976 UMass Minutemen football team =

American college football season

1976 UMass Minutemen football
- Conference: Yankee Conference
- Record: 5–5 (3–1 Yankee)
- Head coach: Dick MacPherson (6th season)
- Home stadium: Alumni Stadium

1976 Yankee Conference football standings
	Conf.					Overall
Team	W		L		T	W		L		T
No. T–8 New Hampshire $^	4	–	1	–	0	8	–	3	–	0
UMass	3	–	2	–	0	5	–	5	–	0
Maine	2	–	3	–	0	6	–	5	–	0
Rhode Island	2	–	3	–	0	3	–	5	–	0
Boston University	2	–	3	–	0	3	–	7	–	0
Connecticut	2	–	3	–	0	2	–	9	–	0
$ – Conference champion; ^ – NCAA Division II playoff participant; Rankings from Associated Press poll

The 1976 UMass Minutemen football team represented the University of Massachusetts Amherst in the 1976 NCAA Division II football season as a member of the Yankee Conference in Division II (NCAA). The team was coached by Dick MacPherson and played its home games at Alumni Stadium in Hadley, Massachusetts. UMass finished the season with a record of 5–5 overall and 3–2 in conference play.

== Schedule ==
Date	Opponent	Site	Result	Attendance	Source
September 11	Toledo*	Alumni Stadium; Hadley, MA	W 28–14	9,500	
September 18	at Maine	Alumni Field; Orono, ME	W 24–3	7,100	
September 25	at Harvard*	Harvard Stadium; Boston, MA	L 13–24	14,454–1,7000	
October 9	at Boston University	Nickerson Field; Boston, MA	W 33–6	1,000–1,002	
October 16	at Rhode Island	Meade Stadium; Kingston, RI	W 14–7	8,359	
October 23	Connecticut^{†}	Alumni Stadium; Hadley, MA (rivalry)	L 6–28	14,900	
October 30	at Rutgers*	Rutgers Stadium; Piscataway, NJ	L 7–24	20,100–20,400	
November 6	at Holy Cross*	Fitton Field; Worcester, MA	W 21–14	10,011	
November 13	New Hampshire	Alumni Stadium; Hadley, MA (rivalry)	L 0–23	10,900	
November 20	Boston College*	Alumni Stadium; Hadley, MA (rivalry)	L 0–35	13,3004	
*Non-conference game; ^{†}Homecoming
