= 1976 Florida State Seminoles football team =

American college football season

1976 Florida State Seminoles football
- Conference: Independent
- Record: 5–6
- Head coach: Bobby Bowden (1st season)
- Offensive coordinator: George Haffner (1st season)
- Offensive scheme: Multiple
- Defensive coordinator: Jack Stanton (1st season)
- Base defense: 4–3
- Captains: Jimmy Black; Jeff Leggett; Joe Camps; Rudy Thomas
- Home stadium: Doak Campbell Stadium

1976 NCAA Division I independents football records
	Conf.			Overall
Team	W	L	T	W		L		T
No. 1 Pittsburgh		–		12	–	0	–	0
No. 17 Rutgers		–		11	–	0	–	0
San Diego State		–		10	–	1	–	0
No. 12 Notre Dame		–		9	–	3	–	0
Colgate		–		8	–	2	–	0
Boston College		–		8	–	3	–	0
Cincinnati		–		8	–	3	–	0
Memphis State		–		7	–	4	–	0
North Texas State *		–		7	–	4	–	0
Southern Illinois		–		7	–	4	–	0
Penn State		–		7	–	5	–	0
Villanova		–		6	–	4	–	1
South Carolina		–		6	–	5	–	0
Virginia Tech		–		6	–	5	–	0
Army		–		5	–	6	–	0
Florida State		–		5	–	6	–	0
Illinois State		–		5	–	6	–	0
Richmond		–		5	–	6	–	0
West Virginia		–		5	–	6	–	0
Georgia Tech		–		4	–	6	–	1
Temple		–		4	–	6	–	0
Air Force		–		4	–	7	–	0
Dayton		–		4	–	7	–	0
Louisville		–		4	–	7	–	0
Marshall		–		4	–	7	–	0
Navy		–		4	–	7	–	0
Indiana State		–		3	–	7	–	0
Hawaii		–		3	–	8	–	0
Holy Cross		–		3	–	8	–	0
Miami (FL)		–		3	–	8	–	0
Syracuse		–		3	–	8	–	0
Utah State		–		3	–	8	–	0
Northeast Louisiana		–		2	–	9	–	0
Southern Miss		–		2	–	9	–	0
Tulane		–		2	–	9	–	0
North Texas State (originally 6–5) was awarded a forfeit win after Mississippi State was found to be using an ineligible player.; Rankings from AP Poll

The 1976 Florida State Seminoles football team represented Florida State University as an independent during the 1976 NCAA Division I football season. Led by first-year head coach Bobby Bowden, the Seminoles compiled a record of 5–6. Florida State played home games at Doak Campbell Stadium in Tallahassee, Florida.

This would be the last time the Seminoles would finish with a losing record until 2018. Despite the 5-6 record, this season was the start of a turning point for the program, with the season being the first under Bobby Bowden, who would turn around the program, as well as capture multiple national championships during his 34-year tenure that lasted until 2009.

== Schedule ==
Date	Opponent	Site	Result	Attendance	Source
September 11	at Memphis State	Memphis Memorial Stadium; Memphis, TN	L 12–21	30,194	
September 18	at Miami (FL)	Miami Orange Bowl; Miami, FL (rivalry)	L 0–47	22,710	
September 25	at No. 4 Oklahoma	Oklahoma Memorial Stadium; Norman, OK	L 9–24	71,184	
October 2	Kansas State	Doak Campbell Stadium; Tallahassee, FL	W 20–10	30,353	
October 9	at No. 13 Boston College	Alumni Stadium; Chestnut Hill, MA	W 28–9	22,866	
October 16	No. 12 Florida	Doak Campbell Stadium; Tallahassee, FL (rivalry)	L 26–33	42,803	
October 23	at Auburn	Jordan-Hare Stadium; Auburn, AL	L 19–31	58,500	
October 30	Clemson	Doak Campbell Stadium; Tallahassee, FL (rivalry)	L 12–15	21,473	
November 6	Southern Miss	Doak Campbell Stadium; Tallahassee, FL	W 30–27	29,173	
November 13	at North Texas State	Fouts Field; Denton, TX	W 21–20	3,850	
November 20	Virginia Tech	Doak Campbell Stadium; Tallahassee, FL	W 28–21	16,148	
Rankings from AP Poll released prior to the game

== Game summaries ==
=== Florida ===
#12 Florida Gators at Florida State Seminoles

Quarter	1	2	3	4	Total
Florida	10	10	7	6	33
Florida St	0	17	6	3	26

at Doak Campbell Stadium, Tallahassee, Florida

- Date: October 17
- Game attendance: 42,803
- Recap/Box

Game information

First quarter

- FLA – David Posey 27-yard field goal, 11:05. Florida 3–0. Drive: 77 yards.
- FLA – Larry Brinson 15-yard run (David Posey kick), 5:50. Florida 10–0. Drive:

Second quarter

- FSU – Dave Cappelen 21-yard field goal, 13:41. Florida 10–3. Drive: 82 yards.
- FLA – David Posey 54-yard field goal, 11:20. Florida 13–3. Drive:
- FSU – Rudy Thomas 10-yard run (Dave Cappelen kick), 8:10. Florida 13–10. Drive: 70 yards.
- FSU – Kurt Unglaub 26-yard pass from Jimmy Black (Dave Cappelen kick), 0:47. Florida St 17–13. Drive: 80 yards.
- FLA – Wes Chandler 23-yard pass from Jimmy Fisher (David Posey kick), 0:10. Florida 20–17. Drive: 93 yards.

Third quarter

- FSU – Jimmy Black 2-yard run (kick blocked), 6:25. Florida St 23–20. Drive: 80 yards.
- FLA – Willie Wilder 5-yard run (David Posey kick), 3:14. Florida 27–23. Drive: 69 yards.

Fourth quarter

- FLA - 2-yard run (kick failed), 7:44. Florida 33–23. Drive:
- FSU – Dave Cappelen 27-yard field goal, 5:19. Florida 33–26. Drive:

Top passers

- FLA – Jimmy Fisher – 9/12, 139 yards, TD
- FSU – Jimmy Black – 14/17, 211 yards, TD, INT

Top rushers

- FLA – Willie Wilder – 98 yards, TD
- FSU – Jeff Leggett – 15 rushes, 76 yards

Top receivers

- FLA – Wes Chandler/Jimmy Stephens – 4 receptions
- FSU – Ed Beckman – 6 receptions, 113 yards

== Roster ==
1976 Florida State Seminoles football team roster
Players
Coaches
Offense

Pos.	#	Name	Class
WR		Mike Barnes
TE		Ed Beckman
QB		Jimmy Black
WR		Jackie Flowers
OL		Mike Good
OL		Wade Johnson
QB		Jimmy Jordan
RB		Larry Key
OL		Mike Kissner
TE		Greg Lazzaro
RB		Jeff Leggett
RB		Mark Lyles
OL		Mark Meseroll
OL		Alan Risk
OL		Vic Rivas
OL		Tom Rushing
OL		Bill Sawyer
OL		Jon Thomas
RB		Rudy Thomas
WR		Kurt Unglaub

Defense

Pos.	#	Name	Class
DB		Joe Camps
LB		Aaron Carter
DL		Walter Carter
DL		Jimmy Heggins
DB		Ivory Joe Hunter
DB		Bobby Jackson
DL		Willie Jones
DB		Joe Joyner
DB		Mike Kincaid
DL		Rudy Maloy
LB		Detroit Reynolds
DB		Jeff Ridings
DL		Gary Rose
DL		Abe Smith
LB		Mike Stewart
DB		Nat Terry
DL		Scott Warren
DB		Gary Woolford

Special teams

Pos.	#	Name	Class
K		Dave Cappelen

Head coach

- Bobby Bowden

Coordinators/assistant coaches

- George Haffner (offensive coordinator)
- Kent Schoolfield (wide receivers)

Legend

- (C) Team captain
- (S) Suspended
- (I) Ineligible
- Injured
- Redshirt
