= 1976 Marshall Thundering Herd football team =

American college football season

1976 Marshall Thundering Herd football
- Conference: Independent
- Record: 5–6
- Head coach: Frank Ellwood (2nd season)
- Defensive coordinator: Carlin B. Carpenter (2nd season)
- Captains: John "Fuzzy" Filliez; Billy Yanossy
- Home stadium: Fairfield Stadium

1976 NCAA Division I independents football records
	Conf.			Overall
Team	W	L	T	W		L		T
No. 1 Pittsburgh		–		12	–	0	–	0
No. 17 Rutgers		–		11	–	0	–	0
San Diego State		–		10	–	1	–	0
No. 12 Notre Dame		–		9	–	3	–	0
Colgate		–		8	–	2	–	0
Boston College		–		8	–	3	–	0
Cincinnati		–		8	–	3	–	0
Memphis State		–		7	–	4	–	0
North Texas State *		–		7	–	4	–	0
Southern Illinois		–		7	–	4	–	0
Penn State		–		7	–	5	–	0
Villanova		–		6	–	4	–	1
South Carolina		–		6	–	5	–	0
Virginia Tech		–		6	–	5	–	0
Army		–		5	–	6	–	0
Florida State		–		5	–	6	–	0
Illinois State		–		5	–	6	–	0
Richmond		–		5	–	6	–	0
West Virginia		–		5	–	6	–	0
Georgia Tech		–		4	–	6	–	1
Temple		–		4	–	6	–	0
Air Force		–		4	–	7	–	0
Dayton		–		4	–	7	–	0
Louisville		–		4	–	7	–	0
Marshall		–		4	–	7	–	0
Navy		–		4	–	7	–	0
Indiana State		–		3	–	7	–	0
Hawaii		–		3	–	8	–	0
Holy Cross		–		3	–	8	–	0
Miami (FL)		–		3	–	8	–	0
Syracuse		–		3	–	8	–	0
Utah State		–		3	–	8	–	0
Northeast Louisiana		–		2	–	9	–	0
Southern Miss		–		2	–	9	–	0
Tulane		–		2	–	9	–	0
North Texas State (originally 6–5) was awarded a forfeit win after Mississippi State was found to be using an ineligible player.; Rankings from AP Poll

The 1976 Marshall Thundering Herd football team was an American football team that represented Marshall University as an independent during the 1976 NCAA Division I football season. In its second season under head coach Frank Ellwood, the team compiled a 5–6 record and was outscored by a total of 222 to 137. John "Fuzzy" Filliez and Billy Yanossy were the team captains. The team played its home games at Fairfield Stadium in Huntington, West Virginia.

== Schedule ==
Date	Opponent	Site	Result	Attendance	Source
September 4	at Morehead State	Jayne Stadium; Morehead, KY	W 14–31 (forfeit win)		
September 11	No. 20 Miami (OH)	Fairfield Stadium; Huntington, WV	W 21–16	11,732	
September 18	at Illinois State	Hancock Stadium; Normal, IL	W 23–13	7,000	
September 25	Central Michigan	Fairfield Stadium; Huntington, WV	L 7–22	13,479	
October 2	at McNeese State	Cowboy Stadium; Lake Charles, LA	L 9–34		
October 16	Dayton^{†}	Fairfield Stadium; Huntington, WV	W 9–0		
October 23	at Western Michigan	Waldo Stadium; Kalamazoo, MI	L 21–31		
October 30	No. 3 (D-II) Akron	Fairfield Stadium; Huntington, WV	W 13–0	7,191	
November 6	Villanova	Fairfield Stadium; Huntington, WV	L 10–23	13,839	
November 13	at Toledo	Glass Bowl; Toledo, OH	L 8–39	7,289	
November 20	Southern Illinois	Fairfield Stadium; Huntington, WV	L 16–44	10,835	
^{†}Homecoming; Rankings from AP Poll released prior to the game
