= 1976 Rutgers Scarlet Knights football team =

American college football season

1976 Rutgers Scarlet Knights football
- Conference: Independent

Ranking
- Coaches: No. 17
- AP: No. 17
- Record: 11–0
- Head coach: Frank R. Burns (4th season)
- Defensive coordinator: Bob Naso (9th season)
- Home stadium: Rutgers Stadium; Giants Stadium

1976 NCAA Division I independents football records
	Conf.			Overall
Team	W	L	T	W		L		T
No. 1 Pittsburgh		–		12	–	0	–	0
No. 17 Rutgers		–		11	–	0	–	0
San Diego State		–		10	–	1	–	0
No. 12 Notre Dame		–		9	–	3	–	0
Colgate		–		8	–	2	–	0
Boston College		–		8	–	3	–	0
Cincinnati		–		8	–	3	–	0
Memphis State		–		7	–	4	–	0
North Texas State *		–		7	–	4	–	0
Southern Illinois		–		7	–	4	–	0
Penn State		–		7	–	5	–	0
Villanova		–		6	–	4	–	1
South Carolina		–		6	–	5	–	0
Virginia Tech		–		6	–	5	–	0
Army		–		5	–	6	–	0
Florida State		–		5	–	6	–	0
Illinois State		–		5	–	6	–	0
Richmond		–		5	–	6	–	0
West Virginia		–		5	–	6	–	0
Georgia Tech		–		4	–	6	–	1
Temple		–		4	–	6	–	0
Air Force		–		4	–	7	–	0
Dayton		–		4	–	7	–	0
Louisville		–		4	–	7	–	0
Marshall		–		4	–	7	–	0
Navy		–		4	–	7	–	0
Indiana State		–		3	–	7	–	0
Hawaii		–		3	–	8	–	0
Holy Cross		–		3	–	8	–	0
Miami (FL)		–		3	–	8	–	0
Syracuse		–		3	–	8	–	0
Utah State		–		3	–	8	–	0
Northeast Louisiana		–		2	–	9	–	0
Southern Miss		–		2	–	9	–	0
Tulane		–		2	–	9	–	0
North Texas State (originally 6–5) was awarded a forfeit win after Mississippi State was found to be using an ineligible player.; Rankings from AP Poll

The 1976 Rutgers Scarlet Knights football team was an American football team that represented Rutgers University as an independent during the 1976 NCAA Division I football season. In their fourth season under head coach Frank R. Burns, the Scarlet Knights compiled a perfect 11–0 record while competing as an independent, outscored their opponents 287 to 81, and were ranked No. 17 in the final AP Poll. The Rutgers players decided to decline playing in the inaugural Independence Bowl against McNeese State in Shreveport, Louisiana. Including the 1975 season, Rutgers won 18 consecutive games starting on October 18, 1975. In 2023, the 1976 team was inducted as a group into the Rutgers Hall of Fame.

The team led the nation in both total defense (179.2 yards per game) and rushing defense (83.9 yards per game) and tied with Michigan in scoring defense (7.4 points per game). The nucleus of the team consisted of players recruited by Burns in his early years as head coach:

- Senior co-captain and defensive end Nate Toran tallied 17 quarterback sacks and received the Homer Hazel Trophy as the team's most valuable player award.
- Senior wide receiver Mark Twitty led the team with 514 receiving yardsl He also set a Rutgers career record with 1,272 receiving yards.
- Senior Henry Jenkins led the nation with an average of 15 yards per punt return and set a Rutgers record with 449 punt return yards.
- Junior quarterback Bert Kosup completed 69 passes for 1,098 yards.
- Junior halfbacks Mark Lassiter and Mike Fisher led the team in scoring with 18 touchdowns (108 points) each.
- Junior linebacker Jim Hughes led the team with 113 tackles.
- Sophomore halfback Glen Kehler led the team with 764 rushing yards and an average of 5.1 yars per carry.

The team played its home games at Rutgers Stadium in Piscataway, New Jersey.

== Schedule ==
Date	Opponent	Rank	Site	Result	Attendance	Source
September 11	at Navy		Navy–Marine Corps Memorial Stadium; Annapolis, MD	W 13–3	17,501	
September 18	at Bucknell		Memorial Stadium; Lewisburg, PA	W 19–7	8,500	
September 25	at Princeton		Palmer Stadium; Princeton, NJ (rivalry)	W 17–0	29,500	
October 2	Cornell		Rutgers Stadium; Piscataway, NJ	W 21–14	16,000	
October 9	Connecticut^{†}		Rutgers Stadium; Piscataway, NJ	W 38–0	8,500	
October 16	at Lehigh		Taylor Stadium; Bethlehem, PA	W 28–21	15,000	
October 23	vs. Columbia		Giants Stadium; East Rutherford, NJ	W 47–0	42,328	
October 30	UMass		Rutgers Stadium; Piscataway, NJ	W 24–7	20,100–20,400	
November 6	Louisville		Rutgers Stadium; Piscataway, NJ	W 34–0	16,000	
November 13	at Tulane		Louisiana Superdome; New Orleans, LA	W 29–20	28,872	
November 25	vs. Colgate	No. 17	Giants Stadium; East Rutherford, NJ	W 17–9	33,405	
^{†}Homecoming; Rankings from AP Poll released prior to the game
