= 1976 Hawaii Rainbow Warriors football team =

American college football season

1976 Hawaii Rainbow Warriors football
- Conference: Independent
- Record: 3–8
- Head coach: Larry Price (3rd season)
- Home stadium: Aloha Stadium

1976 NCAA Division I independents football records
	Conf.			Overall
Team	W	L	T	W		L		T
No. 1 Pittsburgh		–		12	–	0	–	0
No. 17 Rutgers		–		11	–	0	–	0
San Diego State		–		10	–	1	–	0
No. 12 Notre Dame		–		9	–	3	–	0
Colgate		–		8	–	2	–	0
Boston College		–		8	–	3	–	0
Cincinnati		–		8	–	3	–	0
Memphis State		–		7	–	4	–	0
North Texas State *		–		7	–	4	–	0
Southern Illinois		–		7	–	4	–	0
Penn State		–		7	–	5	–	0
Villanova		–		6	–	4	–	1
South Carolina		–		6	–	5	–	0
Virginia Tech		–		6	–	5	–	0
Army		–		5	–	6	–	0
Florida State		–		5	–	6	–	0
Illinois State		–		5	–	6	–	0
Richmond		–		5	–	6	–	0
West Virginia		–		5	–	6	–	0
Georgia Tech		–		4	–	6	–	1
Temple		–		4	–	6	–	0
Air Force		–		4	–	7	–	0
Dayton		–		4	–	7	–	0
Louisville		–		4	–	7	–	0
Marshall		–		4	–	7	–	0
Navy		–		4	–	7	–	0
Indiana State		–		3	–	7	–	0
Hawaii		–		3	–	8	–	0
Holy Cross		–		3	–	8	–	0
Miami (FL)		–		3	–	8	–	0
Syracuse		–		3	–	8	–	0
Utah State		–		3	–	8	–	0
Northeast Louisiana		–		2	–	9	–	0
Southern Miss		–		2	–	9	–	0
Tulane		–		2	–	9	–	0
North Texas State (originally 6–5) was awarded a forfeit win after Mississippi State was found to be using an ineligible player.; Rankings from AP Poll

The 1976 Hawaii Rainbow Warriors football team represented the University of Hawaiʻi at Mānoa as an independent during the 1976 NCAA Division I football season. In their first season under head coach Larry Price, the Rainbow Warriors compiled a 3–8 record.

== Schedule ==
Date	Opponent	Site	Result	Attendance	Source
September 11	at San Jose State	Spartan Stadium; San Jose, CA (rivalry)	L 7–48	19,500	
September 18	Texas A&I	Aloha Stadium; Halawa, HI	L 21–56	22,708	
September 25	at Pacific (CA)	Pacific Memorial Stadium; Stockton, CA	L 12–21	8,625	
October 2	Grambling State	Aloha Stadium; Halawa, HI	L 23–34	20,891–26,000	
October 16	Portland State^{†}	Aloha Stadium; Halawa, HI	W 20–17	18,860	
October 30	Cal State Fullerton	Aloha Stadium; Halawa, HI	W 27–7	17,207	
November 6	Kent State	Aloha Stadium; Halawa, HI	L 6–27	17,447	
November 13	Montana State	Aloha Stadium; Halawa, HI	L 7–28	20,515	
November 20	UTEP	Aloha Stadium; Halawa, HI	W 28–12	14,169	
November 27	Oregon State	Aloha Stadium; Halawa, HI	L 0–59	16,594	
December 4	No. 13 Nebraska	Aloha Stadium; Halawa, HI	L 3–68	33,737	
^{†}Homecoming; Rankings from Coaches' Poll released prior to the game
