= 1976 Tulane Green Wave football team =

American college football season

1976 Tulane Green Wave football
- Conference: Independent
- Record: 2–9
- Head coach: Larry Smith (1st season)
- Defensive coordinator: Moe Ankney (1st season)
- Home stadium: Louisiana Superdome

1976 NCAA Division I independents football records
	Conf.			Overall
Team	W	L	T	W		L		T
No. 1 Pittsburgh		–		12	–	0	–	0
No. 17 Rutgers		–		11	–	0	–	0
San Diego State		–		10	–	1	–	0
No. 12 Notre Dame		–		9	–	3	–	0
Colgate		–		8	–	2	–	0
Boston College		–		8	–	3	–	0
Cincinnati		–		8	–	3	–	0
Memphis State		–		7	–	4	–	0
North Texas State *		–		7	–	4	–	0
Southern Illinois		–		7	–	4	–	0
Penn State		–		7	–	5	–	0
Villanova		–		6	–	4	–	1
South Carolina		–		6	–	5	–	0
Virginia Tech		–		6	–	5	–	0
Army		–		5	–	6	–	0
Florida State		–		5	–	6	–	0
Illinois State		–		5	–	6	–	0
Richmond		–		5	–	6	–	0
West Virginia		–		5	–	6	–	0
Georgia Tech		–		4	–	6	–	1
Temple		–		4	–	6	–	0
Air Force		–		4	–	7	–	0
Dayton		–		4	–	7	–	0
Louisville		–		4	–	7	–	0
Marshall		–		4	–	7	–	0
Navy		–		4	–	7	–	0
Indiana State		–		3	–	7	–	0
Hawaii		–		3	–	8	–	0
Holy Cross		–		3	–	8	–	0
Miami (FL)		–		3	–	8	–	0
Syracuse		–		3	–	8	–	0
Utah State		–		3	–	8	–	0
Northeast Louisiana		–		2	–	9	–	0
Southern Miss		–		2	–	9	–	0
Tulane		–		2	–	9	–	0
North Texas State (originally 6–5) was awarded a forfeit win after Mississippi State was found to be using an ineligible player.; Rankings from AP Poll

The 1976 Tulane Green Wave football team was an American football team that represented Tulane University during the 1976 NCAA Division I football season as an independent. In their first year under head coach Larry Smith, the team compiled a 2–9 record.

== Schedule ==
Date	Opponent	Site	Result	Attendance	Source
September 11	Cincinnati	Louisiana Superdome; New Orleans, LA	L 14–21	29,134	
September 18	at No. 20 Ole Miss	Hemingway Stadium; Oxford, MS (rivalry)	L 7–34	33,231	
September 25	No. 18 Boston College	Louisiana Superdome; New Orleans, LA	L 3–27	20,235	
October 2	at Vanderbilt	Dudley Field; Nashville, TN	W 24–13	21,000	
October 9	at Syracuse	Archbold Stadium; Syracuse, NY	L 0–3	11,223	
October 16	Army	Louisiana Superdome; New Orleans, LA	W 23–10	25,327	
October 23	at Georgia Tech	Grant Field; Atlanta, GA	L 16–28	31,214	
October 30	Memphis State	Louisiana Superdome; New Orleans, LA	L 7–14		
November 6	West Virginia	Louisiana Superdome; New Orleans, LA	L 28–32	29,237	
November 13	Rutgers	Louisiana Superdome; New Orleans, LA	L 20–29	28,872	
November 20	at LSU	Tiger Stadium; Baton Rouge, LA (Battle for the Rag)	L 7–17	64,318	
Rankings from AP Poll released prior to the game

== Roster ==
1976 Tulane Green Wave football team roster
Players
Coaches
Offense

Pos.	#	Name	Class
WR	3	Alton Alexis	Fr
OT	76	Eric Laakso	Jr

Defense

Pos.	#	Name	Class

Special teams

Pos.	#	Name	Class
K	9	Eddie Murray	Fr

Head coach

- Larry Smith

Coordinators/assistant coaches

Legend

- (C) Team captain
- (S) Suspended
- (I) Ineligible
- Injured
- Redshirt
