= 1976 Villanova Wildcats football team =

American college football season

1976 Villanova Wildcats football
- Conference: Independent
- Record: 6–4–1
- Head coach: Dick Bedesem (2nd season)
- Captains: David Graziano; Joseph Mack; William Olsen; Joseph Sopcznski
- Home stadium: Villanova Stadium

1976 NCAA Division I independents football records
	Conf.			Overall
Team	W	L	T	W		L		T
No. 1 Pittsburgh		–		12	–	0	–	0
No. 17 Rutgers		–		11	–	0	–	0
San Diego State		–		10	–	1	–	0
No. 12 Notre Dame		–		9	–	3	–	0
Colgate		–		8	–	2	–	0
Boston College		–		8	–	3	–	0
Cincinnati		–		8	–	3	–	0
Memphis State		–		7	–	4	–	0
North Texas State *		–		7	–	4	–	0
Southern Illinois		–		7	–	4	–	0
Penn State		–		7	–	5	–	0
Villanova		–		6	–	4	–	1
South Carolina		–		6	–	5	–	0
Virginia Tech		–		6	–	5	–	0
Army		–		5	–	6	–	0
Florida State		–		5	–	6	–	0
Illinois State		–		5	–	6	–	0
Richmond		–		5	–	6	–	0
West Virginia		–		5	–	6	–	0
Georgia Tech		–		4	–	6	–	1
Temple		–		4	–	6	–	0
Air Force		–		4	–	7	–	0
Dayton		–		4	–	7	–	0
Louisville		–		4	–	7	–	0
Marshall		–		4	–	7	–	0
Navy		–		4	–	7	–	0
Indiana State		–		3	–	7	–	0
Hawaii		–		3	–	8	–	0
Holy Cross		–		3	–	8	–	0
Miami (FL)		–		3	–	8	–	0
Syracuse		–		3	–	8	–	0
Utah State		–		3	–	8	–	0
Northeast Louisiana		–		2	–	9	–	0
Southern Miss		–		2	–	9	–	0
Tulane		–		2	–	9	–	0
North Texas State (originally 6–5) was awarded a forfeit win after Mississippi State was found to be using an ineligible player.; Rankings from AP Poll

The 1976 Villanova Wildcats football team represented the Villanova University during the 1976 NCAA Division I football season. Head coach Dick Bedesem, coaching his second season with the Wildcats, installed a "wishbone" offense featuring fullback Vince Thompson. After an adjustment period, the offense clicked and Villanova won its final five games, upsetting 13th ranked Boston College. The team played their home games at Villanova Stadium in Villanova, Pennsylvania.

== Schedule ==
Date	Opponent	Site	Result	Attendance	Source
September 11	at West Virginia	Mountaineer Field; Morgantown, WV	L 7–28	33,784	
September 18	at Dayton	Welcome Stadium; Dayton, OH	W 31–30	8,500	
September 25	Illinois State	Villanova Stadium; Villanova, PA	L 17–19	7,000	
October 2	at No. 7 Maryland	Byrd Stadium; College Park, MD	L 9–20	38,131	
October 9	at Richmond	Villanova Stadium; Villanova, PA	L 7–24	6,500	
October 16	at No. 2 (D-II) Delaware	Delaware Stadium; Newark, DE (rivalry)	T 24–24	20,528	
October 23	Youngstown State	Villanova Stadium; Villanova, PA	W 34–14	9,300	
October 30	Boston College	Villanova Stadium; Villanova, PA	W 22–3	8,200	
November 6	at Marshall	Fairfield Stadium; Huntington, WV	W 23–10	13,839	
November 13	Holy Cross^{†}	Villanova Stadium; Villanova, PA	W 56–21	5,782	
November 20	at Temple	Veterans Stadium; Philadelphia, PA (Mayor's Cup)	W 24–7	17,436	
^{†}Homecoming; Rankings from AP Poll released prior to the game
