= 1976 Rhode Island Rams football team =

American college football season

1976 Rhode Island Rams football
- Conference: Yankee Conference
- Record: 3–5 (2–3 Yankee)
- Head coach: Bob Griffin (1st season)
- Defensive coordinator: Pete Adrian (1st season)
- Home stadium: Meade Stadium

1976 Yankee Conference football standings
	Conf.					Overall
Team	W		L		T	W		L		T
No. T–8 New Hampshire $^	4	–	1	–	0	8	–	3	–	0
UMass	3	–	2	–	0	5	–	5	–	0
Maine	2	–	3	–	0	6	–	5	–	0
Rhode Island	2	–	3	–	0	3	–	5	–	0
Boston University	2	–	3	–	0	3	–	7	–	0
Connecticut	2	–	3	–	0	2	–	9	–	0
$ – Conference champion; ^ – NCAA Division II playoff participant; Rankings from Associated Press poll

The 1976 Rhode Island Rams football team was an American football team that represented the University of Rhode Island in the Yankee Conference during the 1976 NCAA Division II football season. In their first season under head coach Bob Griffin, the Rams compiled a 3–5 record (2–3 against conference opponents) and finished in a tie for third place in the conference.

== Schedule ==
Date	Opponent	Site	Result	Attendance	Source
September 18	Northeastern*	Meade Stadium; Kingston, RI	W 15–14	3,760	
September 25	at Brown*	Brown Stadium; Providence, RI	L 0–3	12,500	
October 2	at Maine	Alumni Field; Orono, ME	W 14–9	7,500	
October 16	UMass	Meade Stadium; Kingston, RI	L 7–14	8,359	
October 23	Boston University^{†}	Meade Stadium; Kingston, RI	L 0–36	6,133	
October 30	at Holy Cross*	Fitton Field; Worcester, MA	L 14–33	11,951	
November 6	at New Hampshire	Cowell Stadium; Durham, NH	L 6–31	11,200–11,500	
November 13	at Connecticut	Memorial Stadium; Storrs, CT	W 17–14	5,880	
*Non-conference game; ^{†}Homecoming
