= 1976 Holy Cross Crusaders football team =

American college football season

1976 Holy Cross Crusaders football
- Conference: Independent
- Record: 3–8
- Head coach: Neil Wheelwright (1st season)
- Captains: Bill Campbell; Mark Vollman
- Home stadium: Fitton Field

1976 NCAA Division I independents football records
	Conf.			Overall
Team	W	L	T	W		L		T
No. 1 Pittsburgh		–		12	–	0	–	0
No. 17 Rutgers		–		11	–	0	–	0
San Diego State		–		10	–	1	–	0
No. 12 Notre Dame		–		9	–	3	–	0
Colgate		–		8	–	2	–	0
Boston College		–		8	–	3	–	0
Cincinnati		–		8	–	3	–	0
Memphis State		–		7	–	4	–	0
North Texas State *		–		7	–	4	–	0
Southern Illinois		–		7	–	4	–	0
Penn State		–		7	–	5	–	0
Villanova		–		6	–	4	–	1
South Carolina		–		6	–	5	–	0
Virginia Tech		–		6	–	5	–	0
Army		–		5	–	6	–	0
Florida State		–		5	–	6	–	0
Illinois State		–		5	–	6	–	0
Richmond		–		5	–	6	–	0
West Virginia		–		5	–	6	–	0
Georgia Tech		–		4	–	6	–	1
Temple		–		4	–	6	–	0
Air Force		–		4	–	7	–	0
Dayton		–		4	–	7	–	0
Louisville		–		4	–	7	–	0
Marshall		–		4	–	7	–	0
Navy		–		4	–	7	–	0
Indiana State		–		3	–	7	–	0
Hawaii		–		3	–	8	–	0
Holy Cross		–		3	–	8	–	0
Miami (FL)		–		3	–	8	–	0
Syracuse		–		3	–	8	–	0
Utah State		–		3	–	8	–	0
Northeast Louisiana		–		2	–	9	–	0
Southern Miss		–		2	–	9	–	0
Tulane		–		2	–	9	–	0
North Texas State (originally 6–5) was awarded a forfeit win after Mississippi State was found to be using an ineligible player.; Rankings from AP Poll

The 1976 Holy Cross Crusaders football team was an American football team that represented the College of the Holy Cross as an independent during the 1976 NCAA Division I football season. Neil Wheelwright joined the team for his first year as head coach. The team compiled a record of 3–8.

All home games were played at Fitton Field on the Holy Cross campus in Worcester, Massachusetts.

== Schedule ==
Date	Opponent	Site	Result	Attendance	Source
September 11	New Hampshire	Fitton Field; Worcester, MA	L 3–17	12,551	
September 18	at Army	Michie Stadium; West Point, NY	L 24–26	24,176	
October 2	Dartmouth^{†}	Fitton Field; Worcester, MA	L 7–45	14,416	
October 9	at Colgate	Andy Kerr Stadium; Hamilton, NY	L 6–10	3,000	
October 15	at Boston University	Nickerson Field; Boston, MA	W 31–11	5,103	
October 23	at Brown	Brown Stadium; Providence, RI	L 18–28	11,500	
October 30	Rhode Island^	Fitton Field; Worcester, MA	W 33–14	11,951	
November 6	UMass	Fitton Field; Worcester, MA	L 14–24	10,011	
November 13	at Villanova	Villanova Stadium; Villanova, PA	L 21–56	5,782	
November 20	Connecticut	Fitton Field; Worcester, MA	W 41–40	8,179	
November 27	at Boston College	Alumni Stadium; Chestnut Hill, MA (rivalry)	L 6–59	25,988	
^{†}Homecoming; ^ Family Weekend

== Statistical leaders ==
Statistical leaders for the 1976 Crusaders included:

- Rushing: Brian Doherty, 660 yards and 7 touchdowns on 106 attempts
- Passing: Bob Morton, 797 yards, 68 completions and 2 touchdowns on 161 attempts
- Receiving: Craig Cerretani, 445 yards and 1 touchdown on 39 receptions
- Scoring: Brian Doherty, 50 points from 8 touchdowns and 1 two-point conversion
- Total offense: Bob Morton, 1,256 yards (797 passing, 459 rushing)
- All-purpose yards: Brian Doherty, 796 yards (660 rushing, 102 returning, 34 receiving)
- Interceptions: Mark Cannon, 3 interceptions for 43 yards
