= 1976 Cincinnati Bearcats football team =

American college football season

1976 Cincinnati Bearcats football
- Conference: Independent
- Record: 8–3
- Head coach: Tony Mason (4th season)
- Captains: Mike Woods; Howie Kurnick
- Home stadium: Nippert Stadium

1976 NCAA Division I independents football records
	Conf.			Overall
Team	W	L	T	W		L		T
No. 1 Pittsburgh		–		12	–	0	–	0
No. 17 Rutgers		–		11	–	0	–	0
San Diego State		–		10	–	1	–	0
No. 12 Notre Dame		–		9	–	3	–	0
Colgate		–		8	–	2	–	0
Boston College		–		8	–	3	–	0
Cincinnati		–		8	–	3	–	0
Memphis State		–		7	–	4	–	0
North Texas State *		–		7	–	4	–	0
Southern Illinois		–		7	–	4	–	0
Penn State		–		7	–	5	–	0
Villanova		–		6	–	4	–	1
South Carolina		–		6	–	5	–	0
Virginia Tech		–		6	–	5	–	0
Army		–		5	–	6	–	0
Florida State		–		5	–	6	–	0
Illinois State		–		5	–	6	–	0
Richmond		–		5	–	6	–	0
West Virginia		–		5	–	6	–	0
Georgia Tech		–		4	–	6	–	1
Temple		–		4	–	6	–	0
Air Force		–		4	–	7	–	0
Dayton		–		4	–	7	–	0
Louisville		–		4	–	7	–	0
Marshall		–		4	–	7	–	0
Navy		–		4	–	7	–	0
Indiana State		–		3	–	7	–	0
Hawaii		–		3	–	8	–	0
Holy Cross		–		3	–	8	–	0
Miami (FL)		–		3	–	8	–	0
Syracuse		–		3	–	8	–	0
Utah State		–		3	–	8	–	0
Northeast Louisiana		–		2	–	9	–	0
Southern Miss		–		2	–	9	–	0
Tulane		–		2	–	9	–	0
North Texas State (originally 6–5) was awarded a forfeit win after Mississippi State was found to be using an ineligible player.; Rankings from AP Poll

The 1976 Cincinnati Bearcats football team represented University of Cincinnati as an independent during 1976 NCAA Division I-A football season. The Bearcats, led by head coach Tony Mason played their home games at Nippert Stadium.

== Schedule ==
Date	Opponent	Rank	Site	Result	Attendance	Source
September 11	at Tulane		Louisiana Superdome; New Orleans, LA	W 21–14	29,134	
September 18	at Southwestern Louisiana		Cajun Field; Lafayette, LA	L 3–7		
September 25	Miami (OH)		Nippert Stadium; Cincinnati, OH (Victory Bell)	W 17–0	24,562	
October 2	at Southern Miss		M. M. Roberts Stadium; Hattiesburg, MS	W 28–21	13,500	
October 9	at Arizona State		Sun Devil Stadium; Tempe, AZ	W 14–0	47,297	
October 16	Tulsa		Nippert Stadium; Cincinnati, OH	W 16–7	17,717	
October 30	No. 7 Georgia	No. 20	Sanford Stadium; Athens, GA	L 17–31	49,500	
November 6	No. 6 Maryland		Byrd Stadium; College Park, MD	L 0–21	43,013	
November 13	Ohio		Nippert Stadium; Cincinnati, OH	W 35–0		
November 20	Vanderbilt		Nippert Stadium; Cincinnati, OH	W 33–7	11,265	
November 27	Louisville		Nippert Stadium; Cincinnati, OH (rivalry)	W 20–6	7,597	
Rankings from AP Poll released prior to the game

== Game films ==
- 1976 Cincinnati - Miami (Oh) Football Game Film, Reel 1
- 1976 Cincinnati - Miami (Oh) Football Game Film, Reel 2
- 1976 Cincinnati - Miami (Oh) Football Game Film, Reel 3
- 1976 Cincinnati - Miami (Oh) Football Game Film, Reel 4
