= 1976 Boston University Terriers football team =

American college football season

1976 Boston University Terriers football
- Conference: Yankee Conference
- Record: 3–7 (2–3 Yankee)
- Head coach: Paul Kemp (4th season)
- Home stadium: Nickerson Field

1976 Yankee Conference football standings
	Conf.					Overall
Team	W		L		T	W		L		T
No. T–8 New Hampshire $^	4	–	1	–	0	8	–	3	–	0
UMass	3	–	2	–	0	5	–	5	–	0
Maine	2	–	3	–	0	6	–	5	–	0
Rhode Island	2	–	3	–	0	3	–	5	–	0
Boston University	2	–	3	–	0	3	–	7	–	0
Connecticut	2	–	3	–	0	2	–	9	–	0
$ – Conference champion; ^ – NCAA Division II playoff participant; Rankings from Associated Press poll

The 1976 Boston University Terriers football team was an American football team that represented Boston University as a member of the Yankee Conference during the 1976 NCAA Division II football season. In their fourth season under head coach Paul Kemp, the Terriers compiled a 3–7 record (2–3 against conference opponents), finished in a four-way tie for third/last place in the conference, and were outscored by a total of 225 to 150.

== Schedule ==
Date	Opponent	Site	Result	Attendance	Source
September 18	at New Hampshire	Cowell Stadium; Durham, NH	L 0–13	11,570	
September 24	Northeastern*	Nickerson Field; Boston, MA	W 23–20	4,882	
October 2	at Harvard*	Harvard Stadium; Boston, MA	L 14–37	14,000	
October 9	UMass	Nickerson Field; Boston, MA	L 6–33	1,000–1,002	
October 15	Holy Cross*	Nickerson Field; Boston, MA	L 11–31	5,103	
October 23	at Rhode Island	Meade Stadium; Kingston, RI	W 36–0	6,133	
October 30	at Colgate*	Andy Kerr Stadium; Hamilton, NY	L 14–21	3,500–5,000	
November 6	at Connecticut	Memorial Stadium; Storrs, CT	L 11–40	3,707–3,787	
November 13	Maine	Nickerson Field; Boston, MA	W 28–14	2,656–2,700	
November 20	at Louisville*	Cardinal Stadium; Louisville, KY	L 7–16	7,713	
*Non-conference game
