= 1976 Georgia Tech Yellow Jackets football team =

American college football season

1976 Georgia Tech Yellow Jackets football
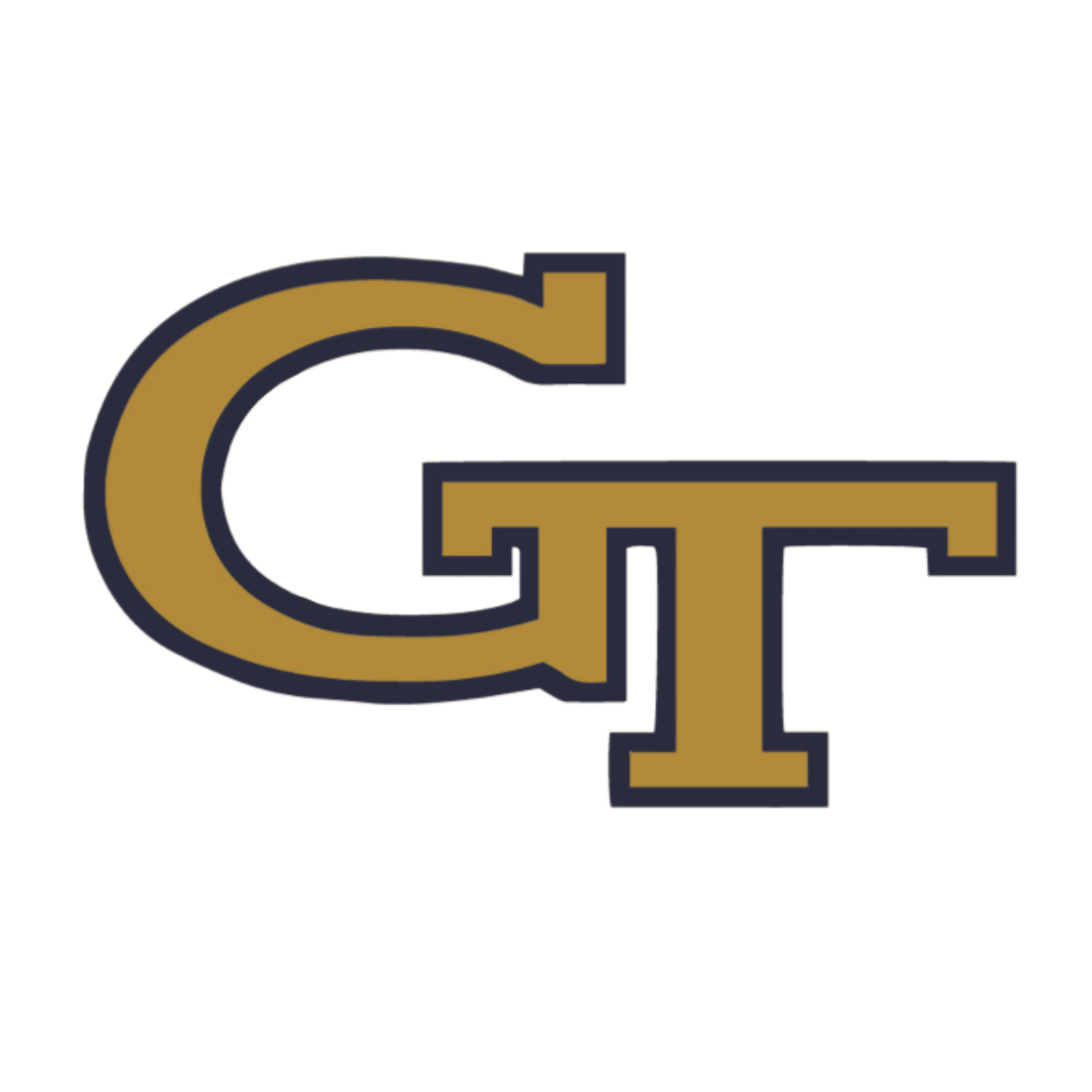
- Conference: Independent
- Record: 4–6–1
- Head coach: Pepper Rodgers (3rd season)
- Captains: Lucius Sanford; Leo Tierney; Tony Daykin
- Home stadium: Grant Field

1976 NCAA Division I independents football records
	Conf.			Overall
Team	W	L	T	W		L		T
No. 1 Pittsburgh		–		12	–	0	–	0
No. 17 Rutgers		–		11	–	0	–	0
San Diego State		–		10	–	1	–	0
No. 12 Notre Dame		–		9	–	3	–	0
Colgate		–		8	–	2	–	0
Boston College		–		8	–	3	–	0
Cincinnati		–		8	–	3	–	0
Memphis State		–		7	–	4	–	0
North Texas State *		–		7	–	4	–	0
Southern Illinois		–		7	–	4	–	0
Penn State		–		7	–	5	–	0
Villanova		–		6	–	4	–	1
South Carolina		–		6	–	5	–	0
Virginia Tech		–		6	–	5	–	0
Army		–		5	–	6	–	0
Florida State		–		5	–	6	–	0
Illinois State		–		5	–	6	–	0
Richmond		–		5	–	6	–	0
West Virginia		–		5	–	6	–	0
Georgia Tech		–		4	–	6	–	1
Temple		–		4	–	6	–	0
Air Force		–		4	–	7	–	0
Dayton		–		4	–	7	–	0
Louisville		–		4	–	7	–	0
Marshall		–		4	–	7	–	0
Navy		–		4	–	7	–	0
Indiana State		–		3	–	7	–	0
Hawaii		–		3	–	8	–	0
Holy Cross		–		3	–	8	–	0
Miami (FL)		–		3	–	8	–	0
Syracuse		–		3	–	8	–	0
Utah State		–		3	–	8	–	0
Northeast Louisiana		–		2	–	9	–	0
Southern Miss		–		2	–	9	–	0
Tulane		–		2	–	9	–	0
North Texas State (originally 6–5) was awarded a forfeit win after Mississippi State was found to be using an ineligible player.; Rankings from AP Poll

The 1976 Georgia Tech Yellow Jackets football team represented the Georgia Institute of Technology as an independent during the 1976 NCAA Division I football season. The Yellow Jackets were led by third-year head coach Pepper Rodgers, and played their home games at Grant Field in Atlanta.

== Schedule ==
Date	Opponent	Site	TV	Result	Attendance	Source
September 11	South Carolina	Grant Field; Atlanta, GA	ABC	L 17–27	38,923	
September 18	No. 3 Pittsburgh	Grant Field; Atlanta, GA		L 14–42	43,424	
September 25	Clemson	Grant Field; Atlanta, GA (rivalry)		T 24–24	43,397	
October 2	Virginia	Grant Field; Atlanta, GA		W 35–14	38,119	
October 9	Tennessee	Grant Field; Atlanta, GA (rivalry)		L 7–42	55,631	
October 16	at Auburn	Jordan-Hare Stadium; Auburn, AL (rivalry)		W 28–10	63,876	
October 23	Tulane	Grant Field; Atlanta, GA		W 28–16	31,214	
October 30	at Duke	Wallace Wade Stadium; Durham, NC		L 7–31	30,300	
November 6	No. 11 Notre Dame^{†}	Grant Field; Atlanta, GA (rivalry)		W 23–14	50,079	
November 13	at Navy	Navy–Marine Corps Memorial Stadium; Annapolis, MD		L 28–34	20,010	
November 27	at No. 4 Georgia	Sanford Stadium; Athens, GA (rivalry)		L 10–13	60,500	
^{†}Homecoming; Rankings from AP Poll released prior to the game

== Roster ==
1976 Georgia Tech Yellow Jackets football team roster
Players
Coaches
Offense

Pos.	#	Name	Class
WR	31	Drew Hill	So
OT	88	Kent Hill	So
RB	40	Eddie Lee Ivery	So
G	71	Randy Pass	Jr
G	78	Elliott Price	Sr
OT	77	Roy Simmons	So
RB	46	David Sims	Sr

Defense

Pos.	#	Name	Class
DB	25	Don Bessillieu	So
DB	30	Tony Daykin	So
DB	42	Eddie Porter	Sr
DB	20	Danny Rhino	Sr
LB	89	Lucius Sanford	Jr

Special teams

Pos.	#	Name	Class

Head coach

- Pepper Rodgers

Coordinators/assistant coaches

Legend

- (C) Team captain
- (S) Suspended
- (I) Ineligible
- Injured
- Redshirt
