= 1976 Virginia Tech Gobblers football team =

American college football season

1976 Virginia Tech Gobblers football
- Conference: Independent
- Record: 6–5
- Head coach: Jimmy Sharpe (3rd season)
- Home stadium: Lane Stadium

1976 NCAA Division I independents football records
	Conf.			Overall
Team	W	L	T	W		L		T
No. 1 Pittsburgh		–		12	–	0	–	0
No. 17 Rutgers		–		11	–	0	–	0
San Diego State		–		10	–	1	–	0
No. 12 Notre Dame		–		9	–	3	–	0
Colgate		–		8	–	2	–	0
Boston College		–		8	–	3	–	0
Cincinnati		–		8	–	3	–	0
Memphis State		–		7	–	4	–	0
North Texas State *		–		7	–	4	–	0
Southern Illinois		–		7	–	4	–	0
Penn State		–		7	–	5	–	0
Villanova		–		6	–	4	–	1
South Carolina		–		6	–	5	–	0
Virginia Tech		–		6	–	5	–	0
Army		–		5	–	6	–	0
Florida State		–		5	–	6	–	0
Illinois State		–		5	–	6	–	0
Richmond		–		5	–	6	–	0
West Virginia		–		5	–	6	–	0
Georgia Tech		–		4	–	6	–	1
Temple		–		4	–	6	–	0
Air Force		–		4	–	7	–	0
Dayton		–		4	–	7	–	0
Louisville		–		4	–	7	–	0
Marshall		–		4	–	7	–	0
Navy		–		4	–	7	–	0
Indiana State		–		3	–	7	–	0
Hawaii		–		3	–	8	–	0
Holy Cross		–		3	–	8	–	0
Miami (FL)		–		3	–	8	–	0
Syracuse		–		3	–	8	–	0
Utah State		–		3	–	8	–	0
Northeast Louisiana		–		2	–	9	–	0
Southern Miss		–		2	–	9	–	0
Tulane		–		2	–	9	–	0
North Texas State (originally 6–5) was awarded a forfeit win after Mississippi State was found to be using an ineligible player.; Rankings from AP Poll

The 1976 Virginia Tech Gobblers football team was an American football team that represented Virginia Tech as an independent during the 1976 NCAA Division I football season. In their third year under head coach Jimmy Sharpe, the Gobblers compiled an overall record of 6–5.

== Schedule ==
Date	Opponent	Site	Result	Attendance	Source
September 4	at Wake Forest	Groves Stadium; Winston-Salem, NC	W 23–6	25,600	
September 11	at No. 14 Texas A&M	Kyle Field; College Station, TX	L 0–19	44,039	
September 18	Southern Miss	Lane Stadium; Blacksburg, VA	W 16–7	35,000	
October 2	William & Mary	Lane Stadium; Blacksburg, VA	L 15–27	35,000	
October 9	vs. VMI	City Stadium; Richmond, VA (Tobacco Bowl, rivalry)	W 37–7	21,000	
October 16	at Virginia	Scott Stadium; Charlottesville, VA (rivalry)	W 14–10	32,618	
October 23	Kent State^{†}	Lane Stadium; Blacksburg, VA	W 42–14	37,000	
October 30	West Virginia	Lane Stadium; Blacksburg, VA (rivalry)	W 24–7	39,000	
November 6	Tulsa	Lane Stadium; Blacksburg, VA	L 31–35	31,000	
November 13	at Richmond	City Stadium; Richmond, VA	L 0–16	20,200	
November 20	at Florida State	Doak Campbell Stadium; Tallahassee, FL	L 21–28	16,148	
^{†}Homecoming; Rankings from AP Poll released prior to the game

== Roster ==
The following players were members of the 1976 football team.

1976 Virginia Tech roster
Paul Adams; Mike Arbaugh; Dale Babione; Jim Banks; Mitcheal Barnes; Tom Beasley; Gippy Belcher; Greg Birtsch; Larry Blunt; Henry Bradley; Gene Bunn; Blair John Buskirk; Steve Cannon; Larry Capps; Roscoe Coles; Tom Cooper; John Dasovich; Rondal Davis; David DeHart; David Stephen Dolphin; Paul Engle; Larry Fallen	Michel Faulkner; Mickey Fitzgerald; Moses Foster; Keith Gibson; John Goodwin; George Heath; Mike Heizer; Danny Hill; Dickie Holway; Tony Ray Houff; Bill Houseright; Scott Hurd; Mathew Dane "Chip" Keatley; Billy King; Kent Knupp; David Lamie; John Latina; Curt Lowery; Keith McCarter; Doug McDougald; Dave McGlothlin	Barry Miller; Lewis Neal; Chuck Nuttycombe; Stuart Patterson; Greg Payne; Rick Razzano; George Roberts; Mike Roy; Ellis Savage; Larry Schmidt; Dennis Scott; Steve Scott; Jerry Sheehan; Gary Smith; Eddie Snell; Mark Steadman; Mike Stollings; Steve Trask; Leonard Walker; Tom Webb
