= Rusty Lisch =

American football player (born 1956)

No. 16, 12
- Position: Quarterback

Personal information
- Born: July 16, 1956 (age 70); Belleville, Illinois, U.S.
- Listed height: 6 ft 3 in (1.91 m)
- Listed weight: 213 lb (97 kg)

Career information
- High school: Belleville West
- College: Notre Dame
- NFL draft: 1980: 4th round, 89th overall pick

Career history
- St. Louis Cardinals (1980–1983); Chicago Bears (1984)

Awards and highlights
- National champion (1977)

Career NFL statistics
- Passing attempts: 115
- Passing completions: 55
- Completion percentage: 47.8%
- TD–INT: 1–11
- Passing yards: 547
- Passer rating: 25.1
- Stats at Pro Football Reference

Russell "Rusty" John Lisch (born July 16, 1956) is an American former professional football player who was a quarterback in the National Football League (NFL). He played college football for the Notre Dame Fighting Irish. He played five seasons for the St. Louis Cardinals (1980–1983) and the Chicago Bears (1984). In five seasons in the NFL, Lisch only managed one touchdown versus 11 interceptions, and ended his career with a 25.1 passer rating. He is considered by many to be one of the least effective quarterbacks in NFL history, if not the least effective, to have started multiple games.

== College career ==
At the University of Notre Dame, Lisch was part of Dan Devine's first recruiting class in 1975. He made his first start in place of injured Rick Slager in 1976, achieving a 40–27 victory against Miami. He started the first three games of 1977, but then yielded the starting job to Joe Montana. Lisch would finally be named the permanent starting quarterback as a fifth-year senior in 1979, winning seven of ten starts, highlighted by his 336-yard passing effort as the Irish rallied from a 17–3 deficit against South Carolina for an 18–17 victory.

== Professional career ==
Lisch began his professional football career as the third-string quarterback with the St. Louis Cardinals. He completed six of 17 passes for 68 yards in the second half of a season-ending 31–7 loss to the Washington Redskins at Busch Memorial Stadium on December 21, 1980. With the Cardinals out of playoff contention again, and injuries to Ken Greene and Roy Green, Lisch was pressed into service as a free safety in the last three games of the 1981 campaign; despite having previously never played the position, he agreed with head coach Jim Hanifan and Cardinals coaching staff that this situation was better than being inactive on the sidelines.

Lisch's rather poor NFL career caused him to receive the "honor" as the worst player in NFL history from sports blog Deadspin in 2011, with the blog saying:

Sure, Leaf and Russell were bigger busts. Lisch, after all, was a fourth-round pick who had backed up Joe Montana at Notre Dame. But if you have one game you need to lose, and you require a quarterback to take you there, Lisch is – hands down – the man you want. In 115 career attempts he threw one touchdown and 11 interceptions. That one touchdown came in St. Louis on Oct. 9, 1983. The pass traveled a single yard, to tight end Doug Marsh. With Neil O'Donoghue's extra point, the Redskins' lead was cut to 31-14 – late in the contest.

One year later, with both Jim McMahon and Steve Fuller injured, Lisch started a game for the Bears against Green Bay, but played so poorly that coach Mike Ditka berated Lisch before benching him late in the first half; Ditka inserted running back Walter Payton at quarterback.

A 2020 ESPN article detailing the Bears' perennially subpar quarterback play at the time revealed Lisch had declined to return to the field after being berated for his poor play. On the subsequent flight home, Lisch, a religious man, was reading the Bible when Ditka walked up and told him, "I hope there is something in that book about job opportunities, because you'll need one on Monday." That Monday, Lisch brought Ditka a rosary prior to being released. It would be Lisch's final season in the NFL.

== Personal life ==
His son is former professional basketball player Kevin Lisch.
