= Rick Slager =

American football and tennis player (born 1954)

Personal information
- Born: 1954 (age 71–72); Columbus, Ohio, U.S.
- Listed height: 5 ft 11 in (1.80 m)
- Listed weight: 190 lb (86 kg)

Career information
- High school: Upper Arlington (Upper Arlington, Ohio)
- College: Notre Dame Fighting Irish (1974–1976)

Richard R. Slager (born March 1954) is a former American football quarterback and tennis player for Upper Arlington High School in Columbus, Ohio, and for the University of Notre Dame. He was the chairman and CEO of VistaCare Hospice Services in Scottsdale, Arizona until March 2008.

After backing up quarterback Tom Clements for two years at Notre Dame, Slager was named the starter by new head coach Dan Devine. In an injury-plagued 1975 season, he completed 66 of 139 passes for 686 yards, often relieved by sophomore Joe Montana, en route to an 8–3 record. During his final season in 1976, Slager led the Irish to a 9–3 record and a top-20 ranking, completing 86 of 172 passes for 1,281 yards and 11 touchdowns. After graduation, Slager served as a graduate assistant coach for three years while attending Notre Dame Law School.

In 1988, Slager founded Karrington Health, Inc. in Bexley, Ohio.
