= 1976 Astro-Bluebonnet Bowl =

- 18th edition
Nebraska Cornhuskers	Texas Tech Red Raiders
(8–3–1)	(10–1)
Big Eight	Southwest
27	24
Head coach: Tom Osborne	Head coach: Steve Sloan
AP / Coaches; 13 / 19	AP / Coaches; 9 / 8
	1	2	3	4	Total
Nebraska	7	7	13	0	27
Texas Tech	3	14	7	0	24
- Date: December 31, 1976
- Season: 1976
- Stadium: Astrodome
- Location: Houston, Texas
- MVP: Rodney Allison (Texas Tech QB)
- Referee: Pat Flood (WAC)
- Attendance: 48,618

United States TV coverage
- Network: TVS Television Network
- Announcers: Merle Harmon, Alex Hawkins, and Ron Franklin

The 1976 Astro-Bluebonnet Bowl was the 18th edition of the college football bowl game, played at the Astrodome in Houston, Texas, on December 31. Part of the 1976–77 bowl game season, It matched the thirteenth-ranked Nebraska Cornhuskers of the Big Eight Conference and the #9 Texas Tech Red Raiders of the Southwest Conference (SWC). Down by ten points in the second half, Nebraska rallied to win 27–24.

== Teams ==
Both teams were making their only appearances in the Astro-Bluebonnet Bowl; this edition (ninth as "Astro-") was played on New Year's Eve at 7 p.m. CST. The Sugar Bowl had been played in this time slot the previous four years, but moved back to New Year's Day this season.

=== Nebraska ===
The Cornhuskers started the season ranked first, but a tie to LSU dropped them to #8. Five straight victories made them rise back to third before a matchup with #17 Missouri. The 34–24 home loss dropped them to ninth, with victories over Kansas and #13 Oklahoma State doing nothing to make them rise nor fall. Losses to Iowa State and #8 Oklahoma dropped them to thirteenth, with a lopsided win at Hawaii ending the regular season on a high note. The Huskers tied for fourth in the Big Eight Conference (with Iowa State) at 4–3 in a year where Oklahoma, Oklahoma State, and Colorado all won a share of the conference title at 5–2. This was Nebraska's sixth bowl game of the decade along with their seventh straight bowl appearance.

=== Texas Tech ===
The Red Raiders won their first eight games, rising from unranked to fifth in the nation with wins over #17 Texas A&M and #15 Texas being highlight wins. However, a loss to #9 Houston at home cost them a chance at an undefeated season, though wins at Arkansas and #18 Baylor meant that the Red Raiders won a share of the SWC, their first conference title since 1955. This was Texas Tech's fifth bowl appearance of the decade. Nebraska 27 Texas tech 24

== Scoring ==
First quarter

- Nebraska – Rick Berns 1-yard run (Al Eveland kick), 5:42 remaining
- Texas Tech – Brian Hall 28-yard field goal, 1:22

Second quarter

- Texas Tech – Billy Taylor 14-yard pass from Rodney Allison (Hall kick), 12:08
- Texas Tech – Taylor 11-yard pass from Allison (Hall kick), 2:14
- Nebraska – Mark Dufresne 22-yard pass from Vince Ferragamo (Eveland kick), 0:33

Third quarter

- Texas Tech – Taylor 8-yard run (Hall kick), 11:32
- Nebraska – Berns 18-yard run (kick failed), 9:19
- Nebraska – Chuck Malito 23-yard pass from Ferragamo (Eveland kick), 7:01

Fourth quarter
No scoring

Reg Gast recovered a Red Raider fumble with 1:34 left in the game to seal the game for Nebraska, who rallied twice from ten-point deficits.

== Statistics ==
Statistics	Nebraska	Texas Tech
First downs	21	24
Rushes–yards	49–164	42–191
Passing yards	232	193
Passes (C–A–I)	14–24–0	15–23–0
Total offense	73–396	65–384
Punts–average	3–36	4–40
Fumbles–lost	2–2	4–1
Turnovers by	2	1
Penalties–yards	1–4	2–21

== Aftermath ==
The teams switched places in the final AP poll, Nebraska climbed to ninth and Texas Tech fell to thirteenth.

The bowl win was Nebraska's seventh in the last eight seasons, and the Huskers had regular bowl appearances for the rest of Osborne's tenure. Texas Tech only reached three bowl games combined in rest of the decade and the next one. Neither returned to the Astro-Bluebonnet Bowl after this game.
