= 1976 Houston Cougars football team =

American college football season

1976 Houston Cougars football
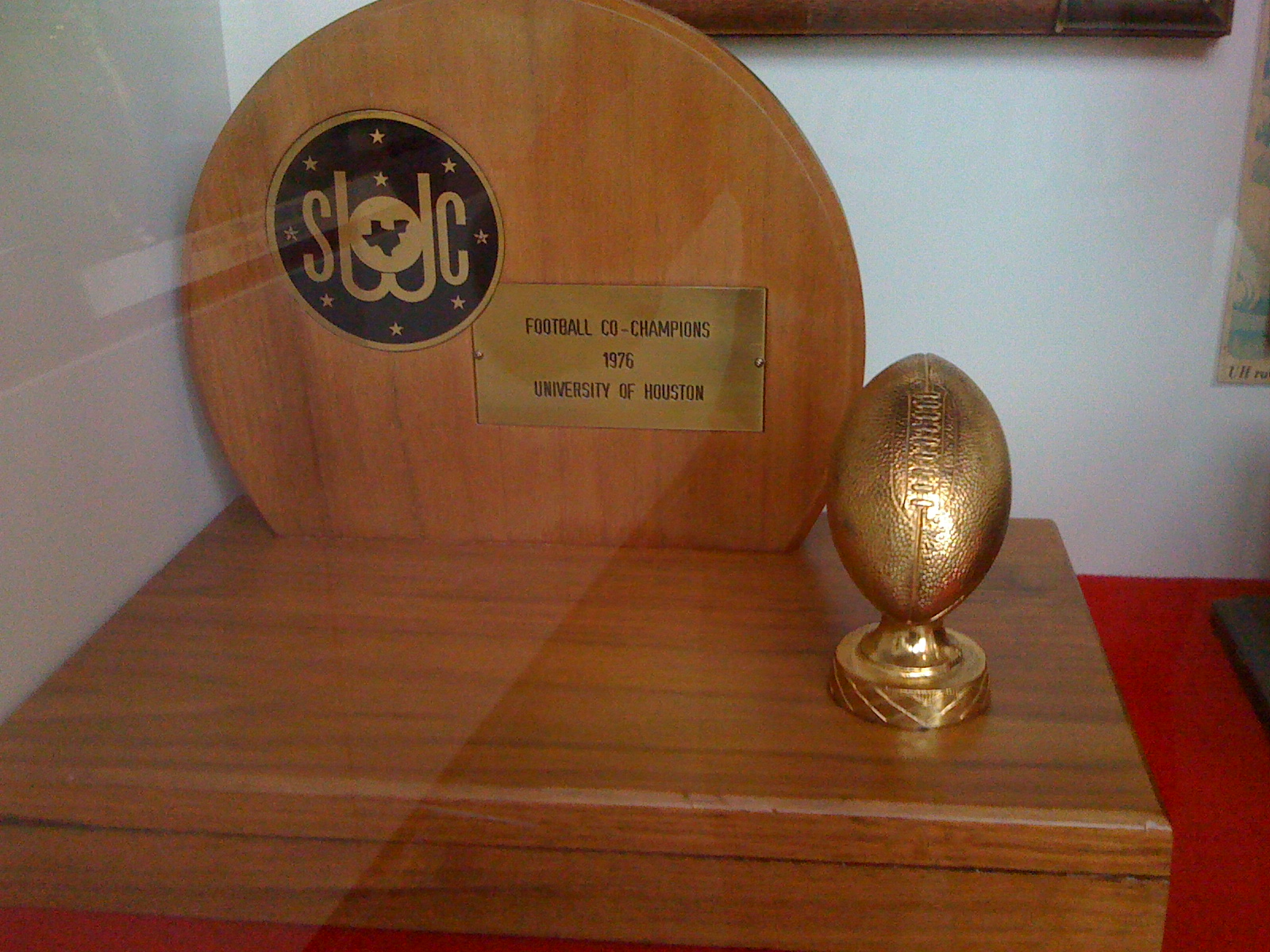
- Houston's 1976 Southwest Conference championship trophy

SWC co-champion Cotton Bowl Classic champion

Cotton Bowl Classic, W 30–21 vs. Maryland
- Conference: Southwest Conference

Ranking
- Coaches: No. 4
- AP: No. 4
- Record: 10–2 (7–1 SWC)
- Head coach: Bill Yeoman (15th season)
- Offensive scheme: Houston Veer
- Defensive coordinator: Don Todd (5th season)
- Captains: Paul Humphreys; Wilson Whitley; Val Belcher
- Home stadium: Houston Astrodome; Rice Stadium

1976 Southwest Conference football standings
	Conf.					Overall
Team	W		L		T	W		L		T
No. 4 Houston +	7	–	1	–	0	10	–	2	–	0
No. 13 Texas Tech +	7	–	1	–	0	10	–	2	–	0
No. 7 Texas A&M	6	–	2	–	0	10	–	2	–	0
Baylor	4	–	3	–	1	7	–	3	–	1
Texas	4	–	4	–	0	5	–	5	–	1
Arkansas	3	–	4	–	1	5	–	5	–	1
Rice	2	–	6	–	0	3	–	8	–	0
SMU	2	–	6	–	0	3	–	8	–	0
TCU	0	–	8	–	0	0	–	11	–	0
+ – Conference co-champions; Rankings from AP Poll

The 1976 Houston Cougars football team, also known as the Houston Cougars, Houston, or UH, represented the University of Houston in the 1976 NCAA Division I football season. It was the 31st year of season play for Houston. The team was coached by 15th-year head football coach, Bill Yeoman.

The team played its home games at the Astrodome, a 53,000-person capacity stadium off-campus in Houston, although the home games vs. Texas A&M and Arkansas were moved to Rice Stadium. It was Houston's first year of season play as a full member of the Southwest Conference eligible as champions. Upon winning the conference as co-champions, the Cougars competed against the Maryland Terrapins in the Cotton Bowl Classic, and finished the post-season at an all-time highest national ranking in the history of the program. Senior defensive tackle Wilson Whitley received the Lombardi Award following the season. Future UH and Baylor head coach Art Briles played on the team.

== Schedule ==
Date	Opponent	Rank	Site	TV	Result	Attendance	Source
September 11	at Baylor		Baylor Stadium; Waco, TX (rivalry)	ABC	W 23–5	37,500	
September 18	at Florida*		Florida Field; Gainesville, FL		L 14–49	49,820	
September 25	No. 9 Texas A&M		Rice Stadium; Houston, TX		W 21–10	70,001	
October 9	West Texas State*		Houston Astrodome; Houston, TX		W 50–7	23,498	
October 16	at SMU	No. 19	Cotton Bowl; Dallas, TX (rivalry)		W 29–6	28,204	
October 23	No. 15 Arkansas	No. 14	Rice Stadium; Houston, TX		L 7–14	47,192	
October 30	TCU^{†}		Houston Astrodome; Houston, TX		W 49–21	18,263	
November 6	at No. 20 Texas	No. 19	Memorial Stadium; Austin, TX		W 30–0	77,809	
November 20	at No. 5 Texas Tech	No. 9	Jones Stadium; Lubbock, TX (rivalry)	ABC	W 27–19	45,102	
November 27	at Rice	No. 7	Rice Stadium; Houston, TX (rivalry)		W 42–20	32,212	
December 4	Miami (FL)*	No. 6	Houston Astrodome; Houston, TX		W 21–16	20,849	
January 1	vs. No. 4 Maryland*	No. 6	Cotton Bowl; Dallas, TX (Cotton Bowl Classic)	CBS	W 30–21	58,500	
*Non-conference game; ^{†}Homecoming; Rankings from AP Poll released prior to the game

== Rankings ==
Week-to-Week Rankings Legend: ██ Increase in ranking. ██ Decrease in ranking. ██ Not ranked the previous week.
Poll	Pre	Wk 1	Wk 2	Wk 3	Wk 4	Wk 5	Wk 6	Wk 7	Wk 8	Wk 9	Wk 10	Wk 11	Wk 12	Final
AP	NR	NR	NR	NR	NR	19	14	NR	19	12	9	7	6	4

== Game summaries ==
=== at Baylor ===
Game One – Houston Cougars (0–0) at Baylor Bears (0–0) – Game summary

Quarter	1	2	3	4	Total
Cougars	0	0	6	17	23
Bears	5	0	0	0	5

at Baylor Stadium • Waco, Texas

- Date: September 11, 1976
- Game time: 3:20 p.m. CDT
- Game attendance: 37,500
- TV announcers (ABC): Verne Lundquist (play-by-play) and Lee Grosscup (color commentator)

Game information

First Quarter

- (0:00) BAY –
- (0:00) BAY –

Second Quarter

No scoring plays

Third Quarter

- (0:00) HOU –

Fourth Quarter

- (0:00) HOU –
- (0:00) HOU –
- (0:00) HOU –

Statistics	HOU	BAY
First downs		
Total yards		
Rushing yards		
Passing yards		
Passing: Comp–Att–Int		
Time of possession		

Team	Category	Player	Statistics
Houston	Passing		
Houston	Rushing		
Houston	Receiving		
Baylor	Passing		
Baylor	Rushing		
Baylor	Receiving		

=== at Florida ===
Game Two – Houston Cougars (1–0) at Florida Gators (0–1) – Game summary

Quarter	1	2	3	4	Total
Cougars	0	7	7	0	14
Gators	14	14	14	7	49

at Florida Field • Gainesville, Florida

- Date: September 18, 1976
- Game time: 6:30 p.m. CDT
- Game attendance: 49,820

Game information

First Quarter

- (0:00) FLA –
- (0:00) FLA –

Second Quarter

- (0:00) FLA –
- (0:00) FLA –
- (0:00) HOU –

Third Quarter

- (0:00) FLA –
- (0:00) HOU –
- (0:00) FLA –

Fourth Quarter

- (0:00) FLA –

Statistics	HOU	FLA
First downs		
Total yards		
Rushing yards		
Passing yards		
Passing: Comp–Att–Int		
Time of possession		

Team	Category	Player	Statistics
Houston	Passing		
Houston	Rushing		
Houston	Receiving		
Florida	Passing		
Florida	Rushing		
Florida	Receiving		

=== at Texas ===
Game Eight – No. 19 Houston Cougars (5–2) at No. 20 Texas Longhorns (3–2–1) – Game summary

Quarter	1	2	3	4	Total
No. 19 Cougars	7	3	6	14	30
No. 20 Longhorns	0	0	0	0	0

at Memorial Stadium • Austin, Texas

- Date: November 6, 1976
- Game time: 3:30 p.m. CST
- Game attendance: 77,809

Game information

First Quarter

- (2:47) HOU –

Second Quarter

- (0:36) HOU –

Third Quarter

- (11:35) HOU –
- (2:58) HOU –

Fourth Quarter

- (11:28) HOU –
- (3:51) HOU –

Statistics	HOU	TEX
First downs		
Total yards		
Rushing yards		
Passing yards		
Passing: Comp–Att–Int		
Time of possession		

Team	Category	Player	Statistics
Houston	Passing		
Houston	Rushing		
Houston	Receiving		
Texas	Passing		
Texas	Rushing		
Texas	Receiving		

=== vs Maryland (Cotton Bowl Classic) ===
1977 Cotton Bowl Classic: No. 4 Maryland Terrapins (11–0) vs No. 6 Houston Cougars (9–2) – Game summary

Quarter	1	2	3	4	Total
No. 4 Terrapins	0	7	7	7	21
No. 6 Cougars	21	6	0	3	30

at Cotton Bowl • Dallas, Texas

- Date: January 1, 1977
- Game time: 1:00 p.m. CST
- Game attendance: 58,500
- Referee: James Artley (SEC)
- TV announcers (CBS): Lindsey Nelson (play-by-play) and Paul Hornung (color commentator)

Game information

First quarter

- (6:27) HOU – Dyral Thomas 11-yard run, (Lennard Coplin kick) (Drive: 11 plays, 80 yards, 0:00; Houston 7–0)
- (3:13) HOU – Alois Blackwell 33-yard run, (Lennard Coplin kick) (Drive: 3 plays, 38 yards, 0:00; Houston 14–0)
- (0:51) HOU – Alois Blackwell 1-yard run, (Lennard Coplin kick) (Drive: 5 plays, 24 yards, 0:00; Houston 21–0)

Second quarter

- (9:36) MD – Mark Manges 6-yard run, (Ed Loncak kick) (Drive: 8 plays, 49 yards, 0:00; Houston 21–7)
- (0:55) HOU – Don Bass 33-yard pass from Danny Davis, (Lennard Coplin kick fail) (Drive: 8 plays, 35 yards, 0:00; Houston 27–7)

Third quarter

- (1:41) MD – Eric Sievers 11-yard pass from Mark Manges, (Mike Sochko kick) (Drive: 7 plays, 97 yards, 0:00; Houston 27–14)

Fourth quarter

- (8:46) MD – Tim Wilson 1-yard run, (Mike Sochko kick) (Drive: 6 plays, 30 yards, 0:00; Houston 27–21)
- (0:18) HOU – Lennard Coplin 28-yard field goal (Drive: 14 plays, 81 yards, 0:00; Houston 30–21)

Statistics	MD	HOU
First downs	17	20
Total yards	299	428
Rushing yards	120	320
Passing yards	179	108
Passing: Comp–Att–Int	17–32–0	5–8–0
Time of possession		

Team	Category	Player	Statistics
Maryland	Passing		
Maryland	Rushing		
Maryland	Receiving		
Houston	Passing		
Houston	Rushing		
Houston	Receiving		

== Coaching staff ==
Name	Position	Alma mater (Year)	Year at Houston
Bill Yeoman	Head coach/offensive coordinator	Army (1948)	15th
Don Todd	Defensive coordinator	Hardin–Simmons (1964)	5th
Melvin Brown	Offensive backs coach	Oklahoma (1954)	15th
Clarence Daniel	Defensive backs coach	Huron (1955)	5th
Ronny Peacock	Defensive backs coach	Houston (1972)	3rd
Billy Willingham	Offensive line coach	TCU (1951)	10th
Elmer Redd	Offensive backfield coach	Prairie View A&M (1950)	7th
Gary Mullins	Linebackers coach	Houston (1972)	2nd
Joe Arenas	Wide receivers coach	Nebraska-Omaha (1951)	14th
