= List of Texas Tech Red Raiders head football coaches =

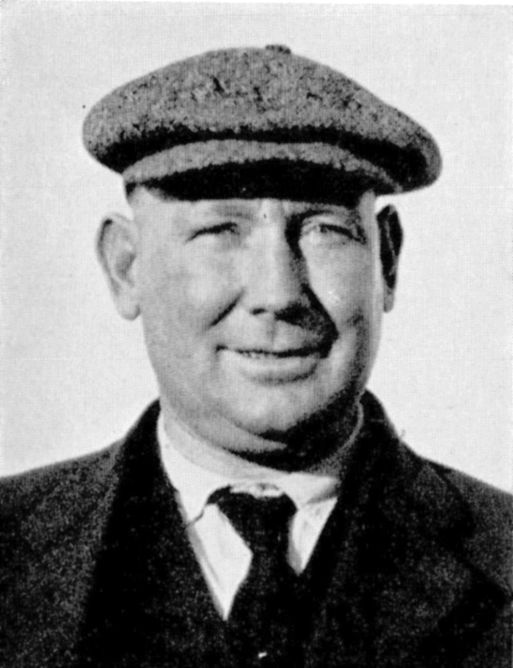
The first coach of the Red Raiders, known then as the Matadors, was Ewing Y. Freeland.

The Texas Tech Red Raiders football program is a college football team that represents Texas Tech University in the Big 12 Conference in the National Collegiate Athletic Association (NCAA) Division I Football Bowl Subdivision. The program has had 17 head coaches, and three interim head coaches, since it began play during the 1925 season.

Texas Tech (then known as Texas Technological College) was known as the "Matadors" from 1925 to 1936, a name suggested by the wife of Ewing Y. Freeland, the first football coach, to reflect the influence of the Spanish Renaissance architecture on campus. In 1932, Texas Tech joined the Border Intercollegiate Athletic Association. The school's short-lived Matadors moniker was replaced officially in 1937 with "Red Raiders", the nickname the team has had ever since. The same year, Pete Cawthon, Texas Tech's third head coach, led the team to their first conference championship and bowl game berth, a 7–6 loss to the West Virginia Mountaineers in the Sun Bowl. Texas Tech suffered four more bowl losses, under two head coaches, before their first postseason win in the 1952 Sun Bowl, under first-year head coach DeWitt Weaver. Before withdrawing from the Border Conference in 1956, the Red Raiders won nine conference championships, the most held by a Border Conference member. Weaver and his predecessor Dell Morgan each won four conference championships, a record for a Texas Tech head coach.

In 1960, Texas Tech was admitted to the Southwest Conference. The Red Raiders won two conference championships in 1976 and 1994, under head coaches Steve Sloan and Spike Dykes respectively. Texas Tech became a charter member in the South Division of the Big 12 Conference in 1996 when the Southwest Conference disbanded. During his ninth season as head coach, Mike Leach led Texas Tech to the program's first division championship in 2008. After Leach was fired at the end of the 2009 season, Ruffin McNeill was named interim head coach for the Alamo Bowl. Tommy Tuberville coached the Red Raiders from 2010 to 2012, resigning after the conclusion of the regular season. Kliff Kingsbury, a former standout quarterback at Texas Tech, coached the Red Raider from 2013 to 2018. Matt Wells, coached the Red Raiders from 2019 to 2021, being fired before the conclusion of the season. Sonny Cumbie will serve as interim head coach for the remainder of 2021. Texas Tech hired Joey McGuire on November 8, 2021, for the 2022 season. McGuire was previously the associate head coach and outside linebackers coach at Baylor University.

== Key ==
Key to symbols in coaches list
General		Overall		Conference		Postseason (Note: Although the first Rose Bowl Game was played in 1902, it has been continuously played since the 1916 game, and is recognized as the oldest bowl game by the NCAA. "—" indicates any season prior to 1916 when postseason games were not played.)	
No.	Order of coaches (Note: A running total of the number of head coaches, with coaches who served separate tenures being counted only once. Interim head coaches are represented with "Int" and are not counted in the running total. "—" indicates the team played but either without a coach or no coach is on record. "X" indicates an interim year without play.)	GC	Games coached	CW	Conference wins	PW	Postseason wins
DC	Division championships	OW	Overall wins	CL	Conference losses	PL	Postseason losses
CC	Conference championships	OL	Overall losses	CT	Conference ties	PT	Postseason ties
NC	National championships	OT	Overall ties (Note: Overtime rules in college football were introduced in 1996, making ties impossible in the period since.)	C%	Conference winning percentage		
†	Elected to the College Football Hall of Fame	O%	Overall winning percentage (Note: When computing the win–loss percentage, a tie counts as half a win and half a loss.)				

== Coaches ==
List of head football coaches showing season(s) coached, overall records, conference records, postseason records, championships and selected awards (Note: Statistics correct as of the end of the 2025 NCAA Division I FBS football season.)
No.	Name	Season(s)	GC	OW	OL	OT	O%	CW	CL	CT	C%	PW	PL	PT	CCs	DCs (Note: Texas Tech participated as a member of the South Division in the Big 12 Conference from 1996 through 2010.)	Notable awards
1	Ewing Y. Freeland	1925–1928	37	21	10	6	.649	—	—	—	—	—	—	—	—	—	—
2	Grady Higginbotham	1929	10	1	7	2	.200	—	—	—	—	—	—	—	—	—	—
3	Pete Cawthon	1930–1940	114	76	32	6	.693	11	3	0	.786	0	2	0	1	—	—
4	Dell Morgan	1941–1950	107	55	49	3	.528	28	3	1	.891	0	3	0	4	—	Border Conference Coach of the Year (1949)
5	DeWitt Weaver	1951–1960	105	49	51	5	.490	19	6	3	.732	2	1	0	4	—	Border Conference Coach of the Year (1951, 1953)
6	J. T. King	1961–1969	92	44	45	3	.495	27	35	1	.437	0	2	0	0	—	SWC Coach of the Year (1965)
7	Jim Carlen	1970–1974	59	37	20	2	.644	20	15	0	.571	1	2	1	0	—	SWC Coach of the Year (1970, 1973)
8	Steve Sloan	1975–1977	35	23	12	0	.657	15	8	0	.652	0	2	0	1	—	SWC Coach of the Year (1976)
9	Rex Dockery	1977–1980	33	15	16	2	.485	10	13	1	.438	0	0	0	0	—	SWC Coach of the Year (1978)
10	Jerry Moore^{†}	1981–1985	55	16	37	2	.309	9	29	2	.250	0	0	0	0	—	—
11	David McWilliams	1986	11	7	4	0	.636	5	3	0	.625	0	0	0	0	—	SWC Coach of the Year (1986)
12	Spike Dykes	1986–1999	150	82	67	1	.550	57	40	1	.587	2	5	0	1	0	SWC Coach of the Year (1989, 1993, 1994); Big 12 Coach of the Year (1996)
13	Mike Leach	2000–2009	127	84	43	—	.661	47	33	—	.588	5	4	—	0	1	Big 12 Coach of the Year (2008); George Munger Award (2008); Woody Hayes Award (2008)
Int	Ruffin McNeill	2009	1	1	0	—	1.000	—	—	—	—	1	0	—	—	—	—
14	Tommy Tuberville	2010–2012	37	20	17	—	.541	9	17	—	.294	1	0	—	0	0	—
Int	Chris Thomsen	2012	1	1	0	—	1.000	—	—	—	—	1	0	—	—	—	—
15	Kliff Kingsbury	2013–2018	75	35	40	—	.466	19	35	—	.351	1	2	—	0	—	—
16	Matt Wells	2019–2021	22	13	17	—	.433	7	16	—	.304	0	0	—	0	—	—
Int	Sonny Cumbie	2021	5	2	3	—	.400	1	3	—	.250	1	0	—	—	—	—
17	Joey McGuire	2022–present	64	45	19	—	.703	33	13	—	.717	2	2	—	1	—	—
