= List of Texas Tech Red Raiders bowl games =

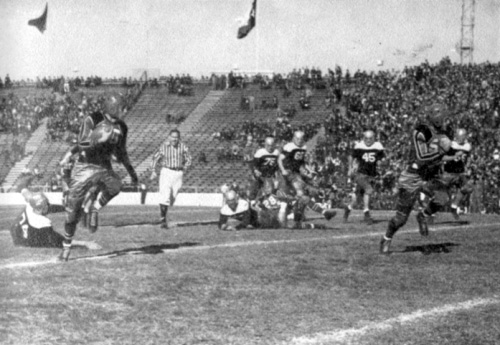
A play during the 1939 Cotton Bowl Classic between Texas Tech and St. Mary's

The Texas Tech Red Raiders football team has appeared in 43 post-season bowl games since the team's inaugural season in 1925. Texas Tech's rich bowl tradition ranks 20th in all-time bowl appearances and has set many bowl game attendance records. The Red Raiders have an overall bowl record of 17 wins, 23 losses, and 1 tie.

Texas Tech's first post-season bowl game was at the conclusion of the 1937 season, when the Red Raiders played in the 1938 Sun Bowl in El Paso, Texas against the West Virginia Mountaineers. Texas Tech's most recent bowl game appearance was the 2024 Liberty Bowl (December) loss against the University of Arkansas Razorbacks. Nine of Texas Tech's 43 bowl game bids have been to the Sun Bowl, the most appearances by any team to the second-oldest college football bowl game.

== Attendance records ==
The Red Raiders' fans have set attendance records at 10 bowl games, including the team's first bowl game appearance in the 1938 Sun Bowl. Although 8 of the 10 attendance records were eventually broken, attendance records from 2 bowl game appearances, the 2004 Pacific Life Holiday Bowl and 2009 AT&T Cotton Bowl Classic, remain unbroken. The 2009 AT&T Cotton Bowl Classic's attendance record of 88,175 was the second-most attended bowl game of the 2008–09 bowl game season.

== List of bowl games ==
Statistics correct as of the end of the 2019 NCAA Division I FBS football season

#	Bowl game (Note: Bowl games are sorted by current name without sponsorship titles.)	Result	Opponent	Stadium	Attendance	Head coach
1	1938 Sun Bowl (Note: The Sun Bowl has been known as the: Sun Bowl (1936–86, 1994–95), John Hancock Sun Bowl (1987–88), John Hancock Bowl (1989–93), Norwest Bank Sun Bowl (1996), Norwest Sun Bowl (1997–98), Wells Fargo Sun Bowl (1999–03), Vitalis Sun Bowl (2004–05), Brut Sun Bowl (2006–09), and Hyundai Sun Bowl (since 2010).)	L 7–6	West Virginia Mountaineers	Kidd Field	12,000^{‡}	Pete Cawthon
2	1939 Cotton Bowl Classic (Note: The Cotton Bowl Classic has been known as the: Cotton Bowl Classic (1937–88, 1996), Mobil Cotton Bowl Classic (1989–95), Southwestern Bell (1997–2000), SBC Cotton Bowl Classic (2001–06), AT&T Cotton Bowl Classic (since 2007))	L 20–13	Saint Mary's Saints	Cotton Bowl	40,000^{‡}	Pete Cawthon
3	1942 Sun Bowl	L 6–0	Tulsa Golden Hurricanes	Kidd Field	14,000^{‡}	Dell Morgan
4	1948 Sun Bowl	L 13–12	Miami Redskins	Kidd Field	18,000^{‡}	Dell Morgan
5	1949 Raisin Bowl	L 20–13	San Jose State Spartans	Ratcliffe Stadium	10,000	Dell Morgan
6	1952 Sun Bowl	W 25–14	Pacific Tigers	Kidd Field	17,000	DeWitt Weaver
7	1954 Gator Bowl (Note: The Gator Bowl has been known as: the Gator Bowl (1946–85), Mazda Gator Bowl (1986–91), Outback Steakhouse Gator Bowl (1992–94), Toyota Gator Bowl (1995–2007), and Konica Minolta Gator (since 2008))	W 35–13	Auburn Tigers	Gator Bowl Stadium	28,426	DeWitt Weaver
8	1956 Sun Bowl	L 21–14	Wyoming Cowboys	Kidd Field	14,500	DeWitt Weaver
9	1964 Sun Bowl	L 7–0	Georgia Bulldogs	Sun Bowl	28,500^{‡}	J. T. King
10	1965 Gator Bowl	L 31–21	Georgia Tech Yellow Jackets	Gator Bowl Stadium	60,127^{‡}	J. T. King
11	1970 Sun Bowl	L 17–9	Georgia Tech Yellow Jackets	Sun Bowl	30,512	Jim Carlen
12	1972 Sun Bowl	L 32–28	North Carolina Tar Heels	Sun Bowl	31,312	Jim Carlen
13	1973 Gator Bowl	W 28–19	Tennessee Volunteers	Gator Bowl Stadium	62,109	Jim Carlen
14	1974 Peach Bowl (Note: The Chick-fil-A Bowl has been known as: the Peach Bowl (1968–96), Chick-fil-A Peach Bowl (1997–2005), and Chick-fil-A Bowl (since 2006))	T 6–6	Vanderbilt Commodores	Atlanta Stadium	31,695	Jim Carlen
15	1976 Astro-Bluebonnet Bowl (Note: The Bluebonnet Bowl has been known as: the Bluebonnet Bowl (1959–67, 1985–86), and Astro-Bluebonnet Bowl (1968–84, 1987))	L 27–24	Nebraska Cornhuskers	Houston Astrodome	48,618	Steve Sloan
16	1977 Tangerine Bowl (Note: The Capital One Bowl has been known as: the Tangerine Bowl (1947–82), Florida Citrus Bowl (1983–93), CompUSA Florida Citrus Bowl (1994–99), OurHouse.com Florida Citrus Bowl (2000), Capital One Florida Citrus Bowl (2001–02), Capital One Bowl (since 2003))	L 40–17	Florida State Seminoles	Orlando Stadium	44,502^{‡}	Steve Sloan
17	1986 Independence Bowl (Note: The Independence Bowl has been known as: the Independence Bowl (1976–89, 2004–05), Poulan Independence Bowl (1990), Poulan/Weed Eater Independence Bowl (1991–97), Sanford Independence Bowl (1998–2000), MainStay Independence Bowl (2001–03), and PetroSun Independence Bowl (since 2006))	L 20–17	Ole Miss Rebels	Independence Stadium	46,369	Spike Dykes (Note: Dykes was named interim head coach after David McWilliams resigned prior to the 1986 Independence Bowl.)
18	1989 All-American Bowl	W 49–21	Duke Blue Devils	Legion Field	47,750	Spike Dykes
19	1993 John Hancock Bowl	L 41–10	Oklahoma Sooners	Sun Bowl	43,848	Spike Dykes
20	1995 Mobil Cotton Bowl Classic	L 55–14	USC Trojans	Cotton Bowl	70,218	Spike Dykes
21	1995 Weiser Lock Copper Bowl (Note: The Insight Bowl has been known as: the Copper Bowl (1989, 1996), Domino's Pizza Copper Bowl (1990–91), Weiser Lock Copper Bowl (1992–95), Insight.com Bowl (1997–2001), and Insight Bowl (since 2002))	W 55–41	Air Force Falcons	Arizona Stadium	41,004	Spike Dykes
22	1996 Builders Square Alamo Bowl (Note: The Alamo Bowl has been known as: the Builders Square Alamo Bowl (1993–98), the Sylvania Alamo Bowl (1999–2001), MasterCard Alamo Bowl (2002–05), Alamo Bowl (2006) and Valero Alamo Bowl (since 2007))	L 27–0	Iowa Hawkeyes	Alamodome	55,677	Spike Dykes
23	1998 Sanford Independence Bowl	L 35–18	Ole Miss Rebels	Independence Stadium	46,862	Spike Dykes
24	2000 Galleryfurniture.com Bowl (Note: The Houston Bowl has been known as: the Galleryfurniture.com Bowl (2000–01) and EV1.net Houston Bowl (2002–05))	L 40–27	East Carolina Pirates	Reliant Astrodome	33,899	Mike Leach
25	2001 Sylvania Alamo Bowl	L 19–16	Iowa Hawkeyes	Alamodome	65,232	Mike Leach
26	2002 Mazda Tangerine Bowl (Note: The Champs Sports Bowl has been known as: the Blockbuster Bowl (1990–93), Carquest Bowl (1994–97), MicronPC Bowl (1998–99), MicronPC.com Bowl (2000), Visit Florida Tangerine Bowl (2001), Mazda Tangerine Bowl (2002–03), and Champs Sports Bowl (since 2004))	W 55–15	Clemson Tigers	Florida Citrus Bowl	21,689	Mike Leach
27	2003 Houston Bowl	W 38–14	Navy Midshipmen	Reliant Stadium	51,068^{†}	Mike Leach
28	2004 Pacific Life Holiday Bowl (Note: The Holiday Bowl has been known as: the Holiday Bowl (1978–85), Sea World Holiday Bowl (1986–90), Thrifty Car Rental Holiday Bowl (1991–94), Plymouth Holiday Bowl (1995–97), Culligan Holiday Bowl (1998–2001), Pacific Life Holiday Bowl (2002–09), and Bridgeport Education Holiday Bowl (since 2010))	W 45–31	California Golden Bears	Qualcomm Stadium	66,222^{†}	Mike Leach
29	2006 AT&T Cotton Bowl Classic	L 13–10	Alabama Crimson Tide	Cotton Bowl	74,222	Mike Leach
30	2006 Insight Bowl	W 44–41^{(OT)}	Minnesota Golden Gophers	Sun Devil Stadium	48,391	Mike Leach
31	2008 Konica Minolta Gator Bowl	W 31–28	Virginia Cavaliers	Jacksonville Municipal Stadium	60,243	Mike Leach
32	2009 AT&T Cotton Bowl Classic	L 47–34	Ole Miss Rebels	Cotton Bowl	88,175^{†}	Mike Leach
33	2010 Valero Alamo Bowl	W 41–31	Michigan State Spartans	Alamodome	64,757	Ruffin McNeill (Note: McNeill was named interim head coach after Mike Leach was fired prior to the 2010 Valero Alamo Bowl.)
34	2011 TicketCity Bowl	W 45–38	Northwestern Wildcats	Cotton Bowl	40,121^{†}	Tommy Tuberville
35	2012 Meineke Car Care Bowl of Texas	W 34–31	Minnesota Golden Gophers	Reliant Stadium	50,386	Chris Thomsen (Note: Thomsen, the OL coach, was named interim head coach after Tommy Tuberville resigned prior to the 2012 Meineke Car Care Bowl of Texas.)
36	2013 National University Holiday Bowl	W 37–23	Arizona State Sun Devils	Qualcomm Stadium	52,930	Kliff Kingsbury
37	2015 Texas Bowl	L 56–27	LSU Tigers	NRG Stadium	71,054	Kliff Kingsbury
38	2017 Birmingham Bowl	L 38–34	South Florida Bulls	Legion Field	28,623	Kliff Kingsbury
39	2021 Liberty Bowl	W 34–7	Mississippi State Bulldogs	Liberty Bowl Memorial Stadium	48,615	Sonny Cumbie
40	2022 Texas Bowl	W 42–25	Ole Miss Rebels	NRG Stadium	53,251	Joey McGuire
41	2023 Independence Bowl	W 34–14	California Golden Bears	Independence Stadium	33,071	Joey McGuire
42	2024 Liberty Bowl	L 39–26	Arkansas Razorbacks	Simmons Bank Liberty Stadium	37,764	Joey McGuire
43	2026 Orange Bowl	L 23–0	Oregon Ducks	Hard Rock Stadium	65,021	Joey McGuire
General: # / Number of bowl games; † / Bowl game record attendance; ‡ / Former bowl game record attendance; Results: W / Win; L / Loss; T / Tie

=== Notes ===
Bowl game

Head coach

=== References ===
General

- "Bowl/All-Star Game Records" (PDF). National Collegiate Athletic Association.

Specific
