= Southwest Conference football individual awards =

Sports awards

Coaches of the Southwest Conference bestowed the following individual awards at the end of each football season.

== Coach of the Year ==
Season	Coach	Team
1962	Hayden Fry	SMU
1963	Darrell Royal	Texas
1964	Frank Broyles	Arkansas
1966	Hayden Fry	SMU
1967	Gene Stallings	Texas A&M
1970	Jim Carlen	Texas Tech
1973	Jim Carlen	Texas Tech
1974	Grant Teaff	Baylor
1975	Emory Bellard	Texas A&M
1976	Steve Sloan	Texas Tech
1976	Bill Yeoman	Houston
1977	Fred Akers	Texas
1978	Rex Dockery	Texas Tech
1979	Bill Yeoman	Houston
1980	Grant Teaff	Baylor
1982	Bobby Collins	SMU
1983	Fred Akers	Texas
1984	Bill Yeoman	Houston
1985	Jackie Sherrill	Texas A&M
1986	Jackie Sherrill	Texas A&M
1986	David McWilliams	Texas Tech
1987	Jackie Sherrill	Texas A&M
1988	Ken Hatfield	Arkansas
1989	Spike Dykes	Texas Tech
1990	David McWilliams	Texas
1991	R. C. Slocum	Texas A&M
1992	Tom Rossley	SMU
1992	R. C. Slocum	Texas A&M
1993	R. C. Slocum	Texas A&M
1993	Spike Dykes	Texas Tech
1994	Spike Dykes	Texas Tech
1995	John Mackovic	Texas
