= 1976 Texas Tech Red Raiders football team =

American college football season

1976 Texas Tech Red Raiders football

SWC co-champion

Astro-Bluebonnet Bowl, L 24–27 vs. Nebraska
- Conference: Southwest Conference

Ranking
- Coaches: No. 13
- AP: No. 13
- Record: 10–2 (7–1 SWC)
- Head coach: Steve Sloan (2nd season)
- Offensive coordinator: Rex Dockery (2nd season)
- Offensive scheme: Option
- Defensive coordinator: Bill Parcells (2nd season)
- Base defense: 3–4
- Home stadium: Jones Stadium

1976 Southwest Conference football standings
	Conf.					Overall
Team	W		L		T	W		L		T
No. 4 Houston +	7	–	1	–	0	10	–	2	–	0
No. 13 Texas Tech +	7	–	1	–	0	10	–	2	–	0
No. 7 Texas A&M	6	–	2	–	0	10	–	2	–	0
Baylor	4	–	3	–	1	7	–	3	–	1
Texas	4	–	4	–	0	5	–	5	–	1
Arkansas	3	–	4	–	1	5	–	5	–	1
Rice	2	–	6	–	0	3	–	8	–	0
SMU	2	–	6	–	0	3	–	8	–	0
TCU	0	–	8	–	0	0	–	11	–	0
+ – Conference co-champions; Rankings from AP Poll

The 1976 Texas Tech Red Raiders football team represented Texas Tech University as a member of the Southwest Conference (SWC) during the 1976 NCAA Division I football season. Led by second-year head coach Steve Sloan, the Red Raiders compiled an overall record of 10–2 with a mark of 7–1 in conference playing sharing the SWC title with Houston. Texas Tech was invited to the Astro-Bluebonnet Bowl, where they lost to Nebraska. The team outscored opponents 336 to 206 and finished the season with the 38th toughest schedule in NCAA Division I.

== Schedule ==
Date	Opponent	Rank	Site	Result	Attendance	Source
September 11	Colorado*		Jones Stadium; Lubbock, TX	W 24–7	44,132	
September 25	at New Mexico*	No. 20	University Stadium; Albuquerque, NM	W 20–16	28,501	
October 9	at No. 17 Texas A&M	No. 15	Kyle Field; College Station, TX (rivalry)	W 27–16	52,651	
October 16	at Rice	No. 10	Rice Stadium; Houston, TX	W 37–13	23,500	
October 23	Arizona*	No. 8	Jones Stadium; Lubbock, TX	W 52–27	44,890	
October 30	No. 15 Texas	No. 6	Jones Stadium; Lubbock, TX (rivalry)	W 31–28	54,187	
November 6	at TCU	No. 5	Amon G. Carter Stadium; Fort Worth, TX (rivalry)	W 14–10	20,986	
November 13	SMU^{†}	No. 5	Jones Stadium; Lubbock, TX	W 34–7	34,780	
November 20	No. 9 Houston	No. 5	Jones Stadium; Lubbock, TX (rivalry)	L 19–27	45,102	
November 27	at Arkansas	No. 9	War Memorial Stadium; Little Rock, AR (rivalry)	W 30–7	41,327	
December 4	No. 18 Baylor	No. 9	Jones Stadium; Lubbock, TX (rivalry)	W 24–21	37,105	
December 31	vs. No. 13 Nebraska*	No. 9	Houston Astrodome; Houston, TX (Astro-Bluebonnet Bowl)	L 24–27	48,618	
*Non-conference game; ^{†}Homecoming; Rankings from AP Poll released prior to the game

== Rankings ==
Ranking movements Legend: ██ Increase in ranking ██ Decrease in ranking RV = Received votes
	Week													
Poll	Pre	1	2	3	4	5	6	7	8	9	10	11	12	Final
AP	RV	RV	20	17	15	10	8	6	5	5	5	9	9	13

== Game summaries ==
=== No. 15 Texas ===
No. 15 Texas Longhorns at No. 6 Texas Tech Red Raiders – Game summary

Quarter	1	2	3	4	Total
No. 15 Longhorns	7	7	7	7	28
No. 5 Red Raiders	7	3	14	7	31

at Jones Stadium, Lubbock, Texas

- Date: October 30
- Game attendance: 54,187

Game information
First quarter
- TTU – Billy Taylor 1-yard run (Brian Hall kick). Red Raiders 7–0.
- TEX – Ted Constanzo 2-yard run (Russell Erxleben kick). Tied 7–7.

Second quarter

- TEX – Jimmy Johnson 1-yard run (Russell Erxleben kick). Longhorns 14–7.
- TTU – Brian Hall 34-yard field goal. Longhorns 14–10.

Third quarter

- TEX – Jimmy Johnson 60-yard run (Russell Erxleben kick). Longhorns 21–10.
- TTU – Rodney Allison 5-yard run (Brian Hall kick). Longhorns 21–17.
- TTU – Larry Isaac 15-yard run (Brian Hall kick). Red Raiders 24–21.

Fourth quarter

- TEX – Jimmy Johnson 1-yard run (Russell Erxleben kick). Longhorns 28–24.
- TTU – Billy Taylor 1-yard (Brian Hall kick). Red Raiders 31–28.

=== SMU ===
External videos
- Snow Bowl

=== Vs. No. 13 Nebraska (Astro-Bluebonnet Bowl) ===
No. 13 Nebraska Cornhuskers vs. No. 9 Texas Tech Red Raiders (Astro-Bluebonnet Bowl) – Game summary

Quarter	1	2	3	4	Total
No. 13 Cornhuskers	7	7	13	0	27
No. 9 Red Raiders	3	14	7	0	24

at Astrodome, Houston, Texas

- Date: December 31
- Game weather: None (indoor stadium)
- Game attendance: 48,618
- TV announcers (TVS): Merle Harmon, Alex Hawkins and Ron Franklin

Game information
First quarter
- NEB – Rick Berns 1-yard run (Al Eveland kick), 5:42. Cornhuskers 7–0.
- TTU – Brian Hall 28-yard field goal, 1:22. Cornhuskers 7–3.

Second quarter

- TTU – Billy Taylor 14-yard pass from Rodney Allison (Brian Hall kick), 12:08. Red Raiders 10–7.
- TTU – Billy Taylor 11-yard pass from Rodney Allison (Brian Hall kick), 2:14. Red Raiders 17–7.
- NEB – Mark Dufresne 22-yard pass from Vince Ferragamo (Al Eveland kick), 0:33. Red Raiders 17–14.

Third quarter

- TTU – Billy Taylor 8-yard run (Brian Hall kick), 11:32. Red Raiders 24–14.
- NEB – Rick Berns 18-yard run (kick failed), 9:19. Red Raiders 24–20.
- NEB – Chuck Malito 23-yard pass from Vince Ferragamo (Al Eveland kick), 7:01. Cornhuskers 27–24.

Fourth quarter

- No scoring plays

Despite losing the game, Texas Tech quarterback Rodney Allison was named the game's MVP. Nebraska trailed by ten in the second half, coming back to win 27–24. The Red Raiders looked to take the lead back late in the fourth quarter, but lost a fumble that was recovered by Nebraska's Reg Gast to seal the Cornhuskers' victory.

== Personnel ==
1976 Texas Tech Red Raiders football team roster
Players
Coaches
Offense

Pos.	#	Name	Class
RB		Tres Adami
QB		Rodney Allison
OL		Terry Anderson
RB		Sam Bailey
RB		Angel Berlingeri
TE		Sylvester Brown
OL		Greg Davis
QB		Tommy Duniven
TE		James Hadnot
OL		Dan Irons
RB		Larry Isaac
RB		Mark Julian
WR		Brian Nelson
OL		Mike Sears
RB		Billy Taylor
OL		Kenny Thiel
WR		Godfrey Turner
OL		Greg Wessels
RB		Jimmy Williams
WR		Sammy Williams

Defense

Pos.	#	Name	Class
DL		Richard Arledge
DL		Bill Bothwell
DL		Harold Buell
DB		Larry Dupre
DB		Eric Felton
DB		Greg Frazier
LB		Thomas Howard Sr.
DL		Jim Krahl
LB		Gary McCright
LB		Mike Mock
DL		Curtis Reed
DB		Don Roberts

Special teams

Pos.	#	Name	Class
K		Brian Hall
K		David Mellott
P		David Kuykendall

Head coach

- Steve Sloan

Coordinators/assistant coaches

- Rex Dockery
  Offensive coordinator/quarterbacks
- Bill Parcells
  Defensive coordinator/linebackers
- Bob Patterson
- Art Zeleznik
- John Cropp
  Wide receivers/tight ends

Legend

- (C) Team captain
- (S) Suspended
- (I) Ineligible
- Injured
- Redshirt

Roster

== Players drafted into the NFL ==
Round	Pick	Player	Position	NFL Club
3	67	Thomas Howard Sr.	LB	Kansas City Chiefs
6	196	Tommy Duniven	QB	Cincinnati Bengals
