= Alois Blackwell =

American football player (born 1954)

No. 24
- Position: Running back

Personal information
- Born: November 12, 1954 (age 71); Cuero, Texas, U.S.
- Listed height: 5 ft 10 in (1.78 m)
- Listed weight: 195 lb (88 kg)

Career information
- High school: Cuero (TX)
- College: Houston
- NFL draft: 1978: 4th round, 110th overall pick

Career history
- Dallas Cowboys (1978–1979); Kansas City Chiefs (1980)

Awards and highlights
- 2× Second-team All-SWC (1976, 1977)

Career NFL statistics
- Games played: 19
- Stats at Pro Football Reference

Alois Sterling Blackwell (born November 12, 1954) is an American former professional football player who was a running back in the National Football League (NFL) for the Dallas Cowboys and Kansas City Chiefs. He played college football at the University of Houston.

== Early life ==
Blackwell attended Cuero High School. As a sophomore, he contributed to the team making its first state final appearance. He accepted a football scholarship from the University of Houston. As a sophomore in 1975, he posted 64 carries (fourth on the team), 364 rushing yards (third on the team), a 5.7-yard average and 2 touchdowns.

As a junior in 1976, he became the starter at running back, registering 151 carries for 934 yards (6.2-yard avg.) and 8 touchdowns. He posted four 100-yard rushing games and contributed to the team's Southwest Conference co-championship. In the 1977 Cotton Bowl, he rushed for 149 yards, 2 touchdowns, earned offensive MVP honors and contributed to a number 4 national ranking, which was the highest in school history.

As a senior in 1977, he tallied 213 carries for 1,169 yards (5.5-yard avg.), 7 receptions for 108 yards and 11 touchdowns. His 1,169 rushing yards were second in the SWC behind Earl Campbell and fifth best in school history. He also scored 11 touchdowns, while having six 100-yard rushing games.

He finished his college career with 2,467 rushing yards (fourth in school history), a 5.8-yard average and 21 touchdowns (third in school history). In 2010, he was inducted into the University of Houston Hall of Honor.

== Professional career ==
=== Dallas Cowboys ===
Blackwell was selected by the Dallas Cowboys in the fourth round (110th overall) of the 1978 NFL draft. As a rookie, he was the third-string running back behind Tony Dorsett and Preston Pearson. He mostly covered kickoffs and was considered one of the hardest hitters on special teams. He played in Super Bowl XII.

In 1979, he was the third-string running back. On October 22, he was waived to make room for defensive end John Dutton.

=== Kansas City Chiefs ===
In April 1980, he signed with the Kansas City Chiefs as a free agent. He was placed on the injured reserve list on August 19.

== Personal life ==
Blackwell worked in the Houston Department of Intercollegiate Athletics. On January 12, 2001, he was hired as the Texas Southern University athletic director. On February 11, 2008, he was relieved of his duties. Blackwell is also a member of Phi Beta Sigma fraternity. He helped charter the Zeta Zeta chapter at the University of Houston on April 6, 1974.
