= 1976 SMU Mustangs football team =

American college football season

1976 SMU Mustangs football
- Conference: Southwest Conference
- Record: 3–8 (2–6 SWC)
- Head coach: Ron Meyer (1st season)
- Offensive scheme: Wishbone
- Defensive coordinator: Steve Sidwell (1st season)
- Base defense: 3–4
- Home stadium: Cotton Bowl

1976 Southwest Conference football standings
	Conf.					Overall
Team	W		L		T	W		L		T
No. 4 Houston +	7	–	1	–	0	10	–	2	–	0
No. 13 Texas Tech +	7	–	1	–	0	10	–	2	–	0
No. 7 Texas A&M	6	–	2	–	0	10	–	2	–	0
Baylor	4	–	3	–	1	7	–	3	–	1
Texas	4	–	4	–	0	5	–	5	–	1
Arkansas	3	–	4	–	1	5	–	5	–	1
Rice	2	–	6	–	0	3	–	8	–	0
SMU	2	–	6	–	0	3	–	8	–	0
TCU	0	–	8	–	0	0	–	11	–	0
+ – Conference co-champions; Rankings from AP Poll

The 1976 SMU Mustangs football team represented Southern Methodist University (SMU) as a member of the Southwest Conference (SWC) during the 1976 NCAA Division I football season. Led by first-year head coach Ron Meyer, the Mustangs compiled an overall record of 3–8, with a mark of 2-6 in conference play, placing seventh in the SWC.

Hired in January, Meyer was previously the head coach at the University of Nevada, Las Vegas (UNLV), then in Division II.

== Schedule ==
Date	Opponent	Site	Result	Attendance	Source
September 11	TCU	Cotton Bowl; Dallas, TX	W 34–14	24,328	
September 18	at No. 14 Alabama*	Legion Field; Birmingham, AL	L 3–56	63,203	
September 25	vs. North Texas State*	Texas Stadium; Irving, TX (rivalry)	W 38–31	25,539	
October 2	at Memphis State*	Liberty Bowl Memorial Stadium; Memphis, TN	L 13–27	31,424	
October 9	at Baylor	Baylor Stadium; Waco, TX	L 20–27	25,000	
October 16	No. 19 Houston	Cotton Bowl; Dallas, TX (rivalry)	L 6–29	28,204	
October 23	at No. 13 Texas	Memorial Stadium; Austin, TX	L 12–13	50,000	
October 30	Texas A&M	Cotton Bowl; Dallas, TX	L 0–36	35,123	
November 6	at Rice	Rice Stadium; Houston, TX	L 34–41	18,000	
November 13	at No. 5 Texas Tech	Jones Stadium; Lubbock, TX	L 7–34	34,780	
November 20	vs. Arkansas	State Fair Stadium; Shreveport, LA	W 35–31	32,000	
*Non-conference game; Rankings from AP Poll released prior to the game

== Roster ==
1976 SMU Mustangs football team roster
Players
Coaches
Offense

Pos.	#	Name	Class
OL	71	Mike Jusko	Fr
WR	21	Emanuel Tolbert	Fr
SR	81	Gene Ratliff	So
QB	12	Ricky Wesson	Sr
RB	40	Arthur Whittington	Jr

Defense

Pos.	#	Name	Class
DL	61	Charles Hunt	Fr

Special teams

Pos.	#	Name	Class

Head coach

- Ron Meyer (1st year)

Coordinators/assistant coaches

Legend

- (C) Team captain
- (S) Suspended
- (I) Ineligible
- Injured
- Redshirt
