= 1976 TCU Horned Frogs football team =

American college football season

1976 TCU Horned Frogs football
- Conference: Southwest Conference
- Record: 0–11 (0–8 SWC)
- Head coach: Jim Shofner (3rd season)
- Offensive scheme: Pro-style
- Defensive coordinator: Bob Junko (1st season)
- Base defense: 4–3
- Home stadium: Amon G. Carter Stadium

1976 Southwest Conference football standings
	Conf.					Overall
Team	W		L		T	W		L		T
No. 4 Houston +	7	–	1	–	0	10	–	2	–	0
No. 13 Texas Tech +	7	–	1	–	0	10	–	2	–	0
No. 7 Texas A&M	6	–	2	–	0	10	–	2	–	0
Baylor	4	–	3	–	1	7	–	3	–	1
Texas	4	–	4	–	0	5	–	5	–	1
Arkansas	3	–	4	–	1	5	–	5	–	1
Rice	2	–	6	–	0	3	–	8	–	0
SMU	2	–	6	–	0	3	–	8	–	0
TCU	0	–	8	–	0	0	–	11	–	0
+ – Conference co-champions; Rankings from AP Poll

The 1976 TCU Horned Frogs football team represented Texas Christian University (TCU) in the 1976 NCAA Division I football season. The Horned Frogs finished the season 0–11 overall and 0–8 in the Southwest Conference. The team was coached by Jim Shofner, in his third and final year as head coach. The Frogs played their home games in Amon G. Carter Stadium, which is located on campus in Fort Worth, Texas.

== Schedule ==
Date	Opponent	Site	Result	Attendance	Source
September 11	at SMU	Cotton Bowl; Dallas, TX (rivalry)	L 14–34	24,328	
September 18	at Tennessee*	Neyland Stadium; Knoxville, TN	L 0–31	79,564	
September 25	at No. 6 Nebraska*	Memorial Stadium; Lincoln, NE	L 10–64	74,981	
October 2	at Arkansas	Razorback Stadium; Fayetteville, AR	L 14–46	37,186	
October 9	Rice	Amon G. Carter Stadium; Fort Worth, TX	L 23–26	14,210	
October 23	at Miami (FL)*	Miami Orange Bowl; Miami, FL	L 0–49	10,539–10,779	
October 30	at Houston	Houston Astrodome; Houston, TX	L 21–49	18,263	
November 6	No. 5 Texas Tech	Amon G. Carter Stadium; Fort Worth, TX (rivalry)	L 10–14	20,986	
November 13	Texas	Amon G. Carter Stadium; Fort Worth, TX (rivalry)	L 7–34	16,523	
November 20	at No. 11 Texas A&M	Kyle Field; College Station, TX (rivalry)	L 10–59	44,055	
November 27	Baylor	Amon G. Carter Stadium; Fort Worth, TX (rivalry)	L 19–24	11,480	
*Non-conference game; Rankings from AP Poll released prior to the game

== Roster ==
- WR Mike Renfro#26
- RB Tony Accomando#24
