= 1976 Rice Owls football team =

American college football season

1976 Rice Owls football
- Conference: Southwest Conference
- Record: 3–8 (2–6 SWC)
- Head coach: Homer Rice (1st season)
- Home stadium: Rice Stadium

1976 Southwest Conference football standings
	Conf.					Overall
Team	W		L		T	W		L		T
No. 4 Houston +	7	–	1	–	0	10	–	2	–	0
No. 13 Texas Tech +	7	–	1	–	0	10	–	2	–	0
No. 7 Texas A&M	6	–	2	–	0	10	–	2	–	0
Baylor	4	–	3	–	1	7	–	3	–	1
Texas	4	–	4	–	0	5	–	5	–	1
Arkansas	3	–	4	–	1	5	–	5	–	1
Rice	2	–	6	–	0	3	–	8	–	0
SMU	2	–	6	–	0	3	–	8	–	0
TCU	0	–	8	–	0	0	–	11	–	0
+ – Conference co-champions; Rankings from AP Poll

The 1976 Rice Owls football team was an American football team that represented Rice University in the Southwest Conference during the 1976 NCAA Division I football season. In their first year under head coach Homer Rice, the team compiled a 3–8 record.

== Schedule ==
Date	Opponent	Site	Result	Attendance	Source
September 18	Utah*	Rice Stadium; Houston, TX	W 43–22	17,000	
September 25	at No. 15 LSU*	Tiger Stadium; Baton Rouge, LA	L 0–31	67,260	
October 2	Texas	Rice Stadium; Houston, TX (rivalry)	L 15–42	57,000	
October 9	at TCU	Amon G. Carter Stadium; Fort Worth, TX	W 26–23	14,210	
October 16	No. 10 Texas Tech	Rice Stadium; Houston, TX	L 13–37	23,500	
October 23	at Texas A&M	Kyle Field; College Station, TX	L 34–57	47,354	
October 30	at No. 14 Arkansas	Razorback Stadium; Fayetteville, AR	L 16–41	43,908	
November 6	SMU	Rice Stadium; Houston, TX (rivalry)	W 41–34	18,000	
November 13	Baylor	Rice Stadium; Houston, TX	L 6–38	10,000	
November 20	at Florida*	Florida Field; Gainesville, FL	L 22–50	53,275	
November 27	No. 7 Houston	Rice Stadium; Houston, TX (rivalry)	L 20–42	32,212	
*Non-conference game; Rankings from AP Poll released prior to the game

== Roster ==
1976 Rice Owls football team roster
Players
Coaches
Offense

Pos.	#	Name	Class
WR	80	Doug Cunningham	Jr
QB	9	Tommy Kramer	Sr

Defense

Pos.	#	Name	Class
DT	67	Kevin O’Connell	Jr

Special teams

Pos.	#	Name	Class

Head coach

- Homer Rice

Coordinators/assistant coaches

Legend

- (C) Team captain
- (S) Suspended
- (I) Ineligible
- Injured
- Redshirt
