= Don Todd =

American football player and coach (1941–2019)

Biographical details
- Born: October 10, 1941; Plains, Texas, U.S.
- Died: March 2, 2019 (aged 77); Katy, Texas, U.S.

Playing career
- 1959–1962: Hardin–Simmons

Coaching career (HC unless noted)
- 1964–1965: Atwell JHS (TX) (assistant)
- 1966–1971: Carter HS (TX)
- 1972–1986: Houston (DC)

Donald Ray Todd (October 10, 1941 — March 2, 2019) was an American football player and coach. He was the defensive line coach and defensive coordinator for the University of Houston from 1972 to 1986. He led the Cougars' "Mad Dog" defense to four top ten national ratings, while tutoring such talents as Lombardi Award winner Wilson Whitley and All-Americans Hosea Taylor, Leonard Mitchell and Mack Mitchell. His defenses were instrumental in the Cougars' achieving national rankings and victories over both Maryland in the 1977 Cotton Bowl Classic and Nebraska in the 1980 Cotton Bowl Classic.

In 2012, Todd was inducted into the University of Houston Athletic Hall of Honor, making him the only assistant coach in school history to enter the Hall.

A native of Plains, Texas, Todd played his college football for Sammy Baugh at Hardin–Simmons University in Abilene, Texas, where he excelled on both sides of the line.
