= 1976 Baylor Bears football team =

American college football season

1976 Baylor Bears football
- Conference: Southwest Conference

Ranking
- Coaches: No. 19
- Record: 7–3–1 (4–3–1 SWC)
- Head coach: Grant Teaff (5th season)
- Offensive coordinator: Bill Yung (3rd season)
- Home stadium: Baylor Stadium

1976 Southwest Conference football standings
	Conf.					Overall
Team	W		L		T	W		L		T
No. 4 Houston +	7	–	1	–	0	10	–	2	–	0
No. 13 Texas Tech +	7	–	1	–	0	10	–	2	–	0
No. 7 Texas A&M	6	–	2	–	0	10	–	2	–	0
Baylor	4	–	3	–	1	7	–	3	–	1
Texas	4	–	4	–	0	5	–	5	–	1
Arkansas	3	–	4	–	1	5	–	5	–	1
Rice	2	–	6	–	0	3	–	8	–	0
SMU	2	–	6	–	0	3	–	8	–	0
TCU	0	–	8	–	0	0	–	11	–	0
+ – Conference co-champions; Rankings from AP Poll

The 1976 Baylor Bears football team represented the Baylor University in the 1976 NCAA Division I football season. The Bears finished the season fourth in the Southwest Conference. Despite finishing the season ranked No. 19 in the country with a 7–3–1 record, the Bears did not receive an invitation to a bowl game.

== Schedule ==
Date	Opponent	Rank	Site	Result	Attendance	Source
September 11	Houston		Baylor Stadium; Waco, TX (rivalry)	L 5–23	37,500	
September 18	at Auburn*		Jordan-Hare Stadium; Auburn, AL	W 15–14	50,000	
September 25	at No. 14 Illinois*		Memorial Stadium; Champaign, IL	W 34–19	44,481	
October 2	South Carolina*		Baylor Stadium; Waco, TX	W 18–17	34,500	
October 9	SMU		Baylor Stadium; Waco, TX	W 27–20	25,000	
October 16	at Texas A&M		Kyle Field; College Station, TX (rivalry)	L 0–24	52,241	
November 6	No. 12 Arkansas^{†}		Baylor Stadium; Waco, TX	T 7–7	47,900	
November 13	at Rice		Rice Stadium; Houston, TX	W 38–6	10,000	
November 20	Texas		Baylor Stadium; Waco, TX (rivalry)	W 20–10	45,500	
November 27	at TCU		Amon G. Carter Stadium; Fort Worth, TX (rivalry)	W 24–19	11,480	
December 4	at No. 9 Texas Tech	No. 18	Jones Stadium; Lubbock, TX (rivalry)	L 21–24	37,105	
*Non-conference game; ^{†}Homecoming; Rankings from AP Poll released prior to the game

== Game summaries ==
=== Texas ===
Texas Longhorns (4–3–1) at Baylor Bears (5–2–1)

Quarter	1	2	3	4	Total
Texas	3	0	0	7	10
Baylor	0	7	7	6	20

at Baylor Stadium, Waco, Texas

- Date: November 20
- Game time: 2:00 p.m.
- Game attendance: 45,500
- Box Score

Game information

First quarter

- TEX – Russell Erxleben 24-yard field goal, 5:30. Texas 3–0. Drive:

Second quarter

- BAY – Ronnie Lee 6-yard pass from Mark Jackson (Lester Belrose kick), 7:00. Baylor 7–3. Drive:

Third quarter

- BAY – Mark Jackson 7-yard run (Lester Belrose kick), 12:01. Baylor 14–3. Drive: 2 plays, 15 yards, 0:41.

Fourth quarter

- BAY – Lester Belrose 23-yard field goal, 14:54. Baylor 17–3. Drive:
- BAY – Lester Belrose 20-yard field goal, 7:59. Baylor 20–3. Drive:
- TEX – Raymond Clayborn 68-yard punt return (Russell Erxleben kick), 1:16. Baylor 20–10.

Top passers

- TEX – Mark McBath – 4/6, 138 yards, INT
- BAY –

Top rushers

- TEX – Jimmy Walker – 8 rushes, 27 yards
- BAY –

Top receivers

- TEX – Michael Lockett – 2 receptions, 75 yards
- BAY –

== Personnel ==
1976 Baylor Bears football team roster
Players
Coaches
Offense

Pos.	#	Name	Class
QB		Sammy Bickham
RB		Gary Blair
OL		Billy Clements
WR		Tommy Davidson
RB		Mike Ebow
RB		Cleveland Franklin
RB		Mark Grayless
OL		Gary Gregory
RB		Greg Hawthorne
RB		Steve Howell
WR		Alcy Jackson
QB		Mark Jackson
OL		Jon Kramer
WR		Ronnie Lee
RB		Ernest Lynch
RB		David Seaborn
WR		David Steven
RB		Bo Taylor
OL		Arland Thompson
OL		Rell Tipton

Defense

Pos.	#	Name	Class
LB		Tim Black
DL		Flynn Bucy
DB		Ron Burns
DB		Gary Green
DB		Tony Green
DL		Gary Hutchison
DL		Gary Don Johnson
DL		Keavin McDonald
DB		Mike Nelms
LB		Shane Nelson
DL		Chris Quinn
DB		Scooter Reed
LB		Johnny Slaughter

Special teams

Pos.	#	Name	Class
K		Lester Belrose
P		Luke Prestridge

Head coach

- Grant Teaff

Coordinators/assistant coaches

Legend

- (C) Team captain
- (S) Suspended
- (I) Ineligible
- Injured
- Redshirt
