= Houston–Texas Tech football rivalry =

American college football rivalry

- Houston Cougars Texas Tech Red Raiders
- First meeting: October 6, 1951; Houston 6, Texas Tech 0
- Latest meeting: September 18, 2026; Texas Tech 28, Houston 26
- Next meeting: 2027

Statistics
- Total meetings: 37
- All-time series: Tied: 18–18–1
- Largest victory: Houston: 45–7 (1977); Texas Tech: 58–7 (1993)
- Longest win streak: Texas Tech: 8 (2010–present)
- Current win streak: Texas Tech: 8 (2010–present)

Locations of Houston and Texas Tech

The Houston–Texas Tech football rivalry is a college football rivalry between the University of Houston Cougars and the Texas Tech University Red Raiders. The rivalry dates back to 1951.

== Series history ==
Historically, Texas Tech and Houston are original rivals. After several matchups in the 1950s, the two teams played each other every year from 1976 to 1995, when both schools were part of the now-defunct Southwest Conference. The two teams have had numerous close games over their history, with 14 matchups being decided by 7 points or less (including a tie in 1987). On September 4, 2021, the two met again to play the Texas Kickoff game at NRG Stadium. After the game, several fans broke out into a fight in the stands.

After having received an invitation in September 2021, Houston announced that they would join the Big 12 Conference on July 1, 2023, which meant that the rivalry would resume as a conference game for the first time since the breakup of the Southwest Conference.

=== Notable games ===
November 20, 1976: Referred to as "the most important game in Texas Tech history" at the time by SWC personality Dirk West, No. 5 ranked Texas Tech hosted No. 9 ranked Houston with a spot in the Cotton Bowl on the line. The Cougars would pull out a 27–19 victory, holding off a Rodney Allison-led comeback in the 4th quarter with a game-saving interception by defensive back Elvis Bradley.

November 25, 1978: Ranked No. 5 in the nation and riding an eight-game win streak, Houston suffered a shock 22–21 upset at Texas Tech thanks to a game-winning two-point conversion pass from Ron Reeves to James Hadnot. It was the Red Raiders' first win over the Cougars since 1959.

September 26, 2009: Playing each other for the first time since 1995 after the breakup of the Southwest Conference, No. 17 Houston came away with a thrilling 29–28 victory over Texas Tech after star quarterback Case Keenum ran for a touchdown with less than a minute remaining in the game.

September 10, 2022: Looking for their first win at Texas Tech since 1990 and needing one more defensive stop on 4th and 20 in overtime, No. 25 Houston gave up a 21-yard pass completion from Donovan Smith to Jerand Bradley on the way to a 33–30 double-overtime loss. Ironically, after the season, Smith would transfer to Houston.

September 18, 2026: In what was the first matchup since 1989 with both teams ranked in the AP poll, No. 13 Texas Tech overcame an early 10–0 first quarter deficit and prevailed 28–26 over No. 22 Houston after stopping a game-tying two-point conversion in the final minute.

== Game results ==
Rankings are from the AP Poll released prior to the game.

Houston victories	Texas Tech victories	Tie games

No.	Date	Location	Winning team		Losing team	
1	October 6, 1951	Houston	Houston	6	Texas Tech	0
2	November 1, 1952	Lubbock	Houston	20	Texas Tech	7
3	November 21, 1953	Houston	#17 Texas Tech	41	Houston	21
4	November 20, 1954	Lubbock	Texas Tech	61	Houston	14
5	October 22, 1955	Houston	Houston	7	Texas Tech	0
6	November 24, 1956	Lubbock	Houston	20	Texas Tech	7
7	November 29, 1958	Houston	Houston	22	Texas Tech	17
8	November 14, 1959	Lubbock	Texas Tech	27	Houston	0
9	November 20, 1976	Lubbock	#9 Houston	27	#5 Texas Tech	19
10	November 19, 1977	Houston	Houston	45	#16 Texas Tech	7
11	November 25, 1978	Lubbock	Texas Tech	22	#5 Houston	21
12	November 24, 1979	Houston	#9 Houston	14	Texas Tech	10
13	November 22, 1980	Lubbock	Houston	34	Texas Tech	7
14	November 21, 1981	Houston	Houston	15	Texas Tech	7
15	November 20, 1982	Lubbock	Houston	24	Texas Tech	7
16	November 19, 1983	Houston	Houston	43	Texas Tech	41
17	November 24, 1984	Lubbock	Houston	24	Texas Tech	17
18	November 23, 1985	Houston	Houston	17	Texas Tech	16
19	November 25, 1986	Lubbock	Texas Tech	34	Houston	7

No.	Date	Location	Winning team		Losing team	
20	November 21, 1987	Houston	Tie	10	Tie	10
21	November 19, 1988	Lubbock	#17 Houston	30	Texas Tech	29
22	November 25, 1989	Houston	#13 Houston	40	#18 Texas Tech	24
23	September 13, 1990	Lubbock	#18 Houston	51	Texas Tech	35
24	November 30, 1991	Houston	Texas Tech	52	Houston	46
25	November 21, 1992	Lubbock	Texas Tech	44	Houston	35
26	November 20, 1993	San Antonio	Texas Tech	58	Houston	7
27	November 19, 1994	San Antonio	Texas Tech	34	Houston	0
28	November 25, 1995	Houston	Texas Tech	38	Houston	26
29	September 26, 2009	Houston	#17 Houston	29	Texas Tech	28
30	November 27, 2010	Lubbock	Texas Tech	35	Houston	20
31	September 23, 2017	Houston	Texas Tech	27	Houston	24
32	September 15, 2018	Lubbock	Texas Tech	63	Houston	49
33	September 4, 2021^{A}	Houston	Texas Tech	38	Houston	21
34	September 10, 2022	Lubbock	Texas Tech	33	#25 Houston	30 ^{2OT}
35	September 30, 2023	Lubbock	Texas Tech	49	Houston	28
36	October 4, 2025	Houston	#11 Texas Tech	35	Houston	11
37	September 18, 2026	Lubbock	#13 Texas Tech	28	#22 Houston	26
Series: Tied 18–18–1

=== Notes ===
^{A} 2021 Texas Kickoff

== See also ==
- List of NCAA college football rivalry games
