= Bill Yeoman =

American football player and coach (1927–2020)

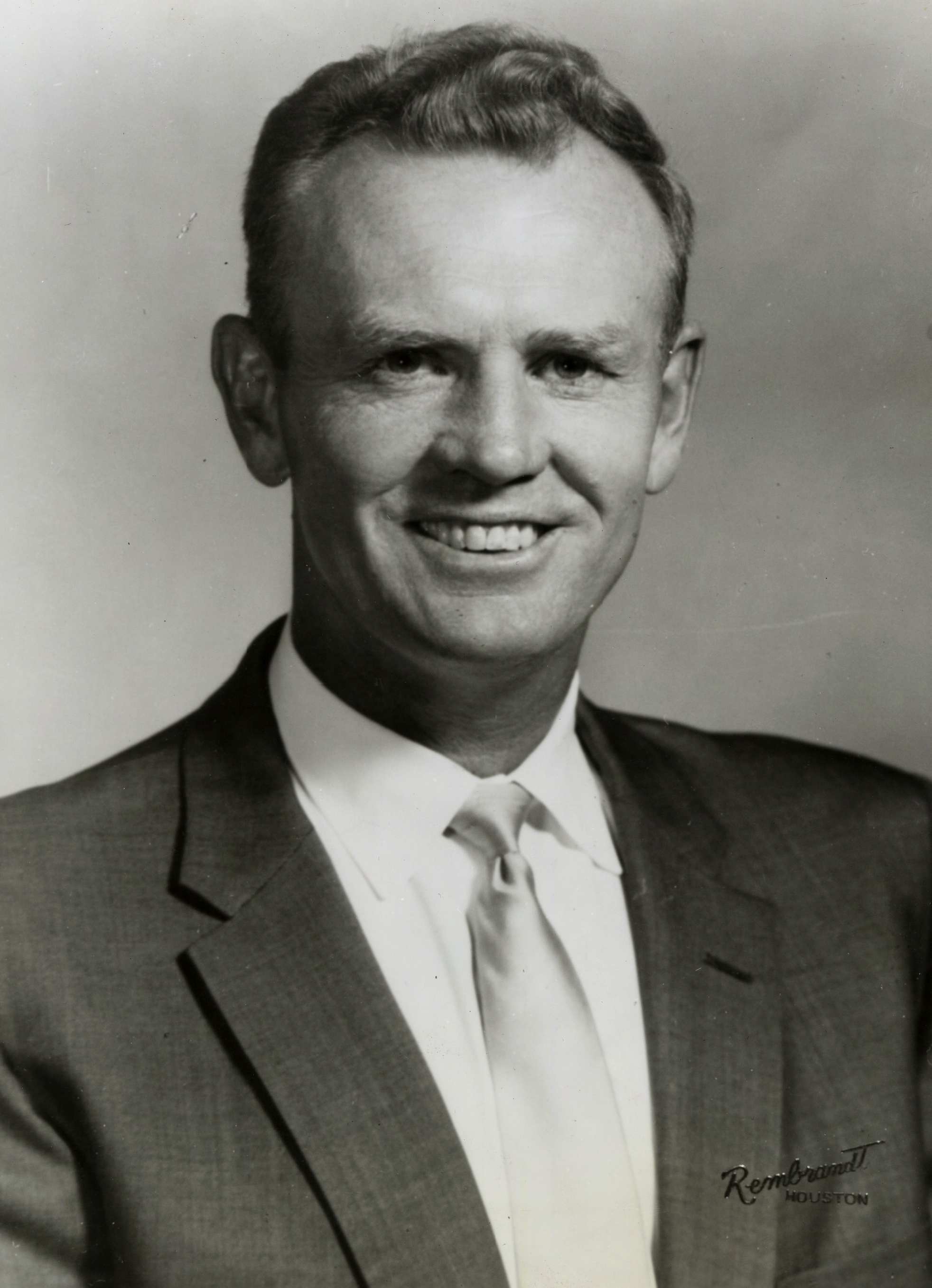
- Yeoman, c. 1962

Biographical details
- Born: December 26, 1927; Elnora, Indiana, U.S.
- Died: August 12, 2020 (aged 92); Houston, Texas, U.S.

Playing career
- 1945: Texas A&M
- 1946–1948: Army
- Position: Center

Coaching career (HC unless noted)
- 1954–1961: Michigan State (assistant)
- 1962–1986: Houston

Head coaching record
- Overall: 160–108–8
- Bowls: 6–4–1

Accomplishments and honors

Championships
- 4 SWC (1976, 1978, 1979, 1984)

Awards
- 3x SWC Coach of the Year (1976, 1979, 1984); Second-team All-American (1948); Second-team All-Eastern (1948)
- College Football Hall of Fame; Inducted in 2001 (profile)

William Frank Yeoman (December 26, 1927 – August 12, 2020) was an American college football player and coach. He served as the head football coach at the University of Houston from 1962 to 1986. In his tenure, he became the winningest coach in Houston Cougars football history, with an overall record of 160–108–8. Yeoman revolutionized offensive football in 1964 by developing the Veer option offense. Yeoman also played a prominent role in the racial integration of collegiate athletics in the South by being the first coach at a predominantly white school in the State of Texas to sign a black player. Yeoman's Cougars finished the season ranked in the top ten of the AP Poll four times and finished 11 times in the AP or UPI top 20.

== Playing career ==
Yeoman played center for Army from 1946 to 1948 under head coach Earl Blaik. The 1946 team was 9–0–1 with a backfield of two Heisman Trophy winners: Glenn Davis and Doc Blanchard. Yeoman was a team captain in 1948 and chosen as a second-team All-American. The Army football teams in which he played compiled a combined 22–2–4 record.

== Coaching career ==
From 1950 to 1953, Yeoman served in the United States Army. After his return from the Army, he became an assistant coach under Duffy Daugherty at Michigan State from 1954 to 1961.

=== Houston ===
After serving as an assistant coach for eight seasons at Michigan State, Yeoman was hired to become the head coach of the University of Houston Cougars in 1962. In his first year, Yeoman guided the team to a 7–4 record and a victory in the Tangerine Bowl. After a losing season in 1963, Yeoman began experimenting with a new offense named the Veer, which used a split-back alignment. Yeoman became the first head college football coach of a major program in the state of Texas to award a scholarship to an African American player. Warren McVea, from San Antonio, signed with UH on July 11, 1964.

Running the Veer offense, Houston led the nation in total offense for three consecutive years in the late 1960s, with averages of more than 400 yards per game each year. The 1968 offensive total was the highest in the country (42.5 points per game), and set an NCAA record. This average was aided in part by the Cougars' 100–6 victory over Tulsa that marked the last time that a team scored 100 points in a top-division college football game.

Houston joined the Southwest Conference in 1976, and the Cougars posted a 10–2 record that included a 30–0 win at rival Texas and a victory over Maryland in the 1977 Cotton Bowl Classic. Yeoman finished as the runner-up for the AFCA Coach of the Year award and won Coach of the Year in the state of Texas. During Yeoman's career, the Cougars won four Southwest Conference Championships (1976, 1978, 1979, 1984), and he earned a 6–4–1 record in bowl games including a win over Nebraska in 1980 Cotton Bowl Classic.

In 1986, allegations surfaced that illegal recruiting inducements and extra benefits had been tendered to UH football players. Yeoman was alleged to have handed out cash to players. Due in part to the investigation, Houston forced Yeoman to retire at the end of the season after a 1–10 campaign.

Yeoman coached 46 All-Americans, and 69 players who later competed in the National Football League, during his career. Former Baylor head coach Art Briles also played for Yeoman at UH. In 1988, the NCAA slapped Houston with three years' probation for over 250 major violations in the latter part of Yeoman's tenure. The Cougars were banned from bowl games in 1989 and 1990 and kicked off live television in 1989. They were also limited to 15 scholarships for the 1989 season. The NCAA said that the penalties would have been even harsher (including being limited to 20 scholarships for 1990 and 50 paid recruiting visits for 1989) had Yeoman still been coach. As it turned out, the penalties that were imposed were harsh enough that the Cougars would need almost the entire decade of the 1990s to recover; they would only have two winning seasons from 1991 to 2004.

== Later life and honors ==
Yeoman was inducted into the University of Houston Hall of Honor in 1998. The College Football Hall of Fame inducted Yeoman in 2001, and two years later the Texas Sports Hall of Fame named him as an inductee. Also in 2002, Yeoman received the Paul "Bear" Bryant Lifetime Achievement Award.

Yeoman died on August 12, 2020, at the age of 92, from kidney failure and pneumonia.

== Head coaching record ==
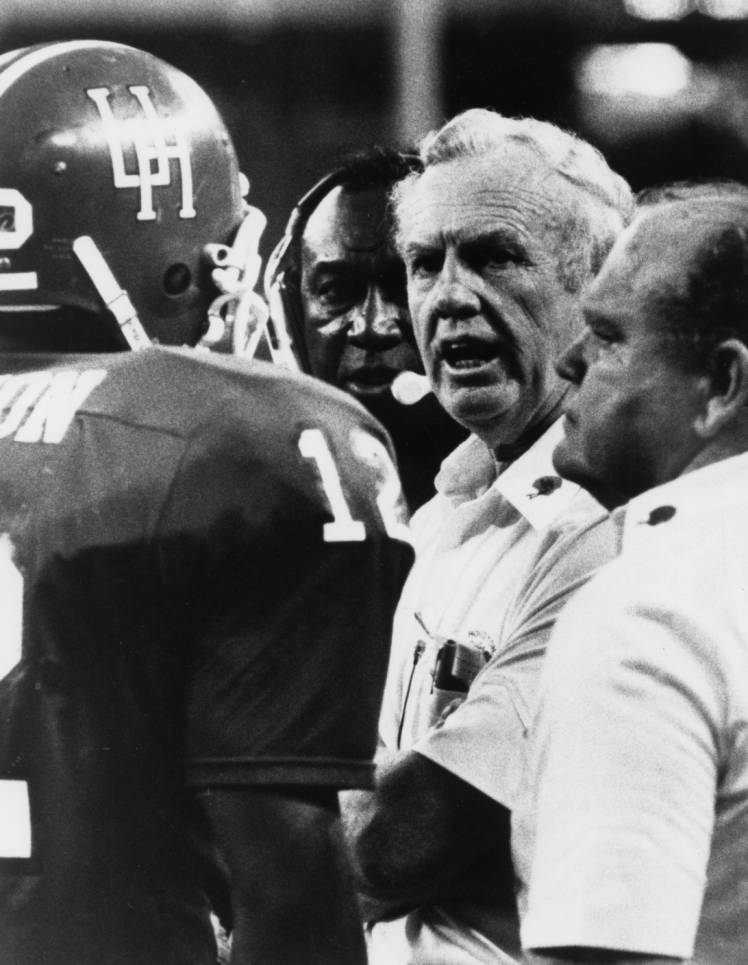
Yeoman as coach of the Houston Cougars

Year	Team	Overall	Conference	Standing	Bowl/playoffs	Coaches^{#}	AP^{°}
Houston Cougars (NCAA University Division / Division I Independent) (1962–1975)
1962	Houston	7–4			W Tangerine		
1963	Houston	2–8					
1964	Houston	2–6–1					
1965	Houston	4–5–1					
1966	Houston	8–2				17	
1967	Houston	7–3				19	
1968	Houston	6–2–2				20	18
1969	Houston	9–2			W Astro-Bluebonnet	16	12
1970	Houston	8–3				13	19
1971	Houston	9–3			L Astro-Bluebonnet	14	17
1972	Houston	6–4–1					
1973	Houston	11–1			W Astro-Bluebonnet	13	9
1974	Houston	8–3–1			T Astro-Bluebonnet	11	19
1975	Houston	2–8					
Houston Cougars (Southwest Conference) (1976–1986)
1976	Houston	10–2	7–1	T–1st	W Cotton	4	4
1977	Houston	6–5	4–4	T–4th			
1978	Houston	9–3	7–1	1st	L Cotton	11	10
1979	Houston	11–1	7–1	T–1st	W Cotton	5	5
1980	Houston	7–5	5–3	T–2nd	W Garden State		
1981	Houston	7–4–1	5–2–1	3rd	L Sun		
1982	Houston	5–5–1	4–3–1	4th			
1983	Houston	4–7	3–5	7th			
1984	Houston	7–5	6–2	T–1st	L Cotton		
1985	Houston	4–7	3–5	5th			
1986	Houston	1–10	0–8	9th			
Houston:		160–108–8	51–35–2				
Total:		160–108–8					
National championship Conference title Conference division title or championship game berth
^{#}Rankings from final Coaches Poll.; ^{°}Rankings from final AP Poll.
