= 1976 Texas A&M Aggies football team =

American college football season

1976 Texas A&M Aggies football

Sun Bowl champion

Sun Bowl, W 37–14 vs. Florida
- Conference: Southwest Conference

Ranking
- Coaches: No. 8
- AP: No. 7
- Record: 10–2 (6–2 SWC)
- Head coach: Emory Bellard (5th season)
- Offensive coordinator: Tom Wilson (2nd season)
- Offensive scheme: Wishbone
- Defensive coordinator: Melvin Robertson (5th season)
- Home stadium: Kyle Field

1976 Southwest Conference football standings
	Conf.					Overall
Team	W		L		T	W		L		T
No. 4 Houston +	7	–	1	–	0	10	–	2	–	0
No. 13 Texas Tech +	7	–	1	–	0	10	–	2	–	0
No. 7 Texas A&M	6	–	2	–	0	10	–	2	–	0
Baylor	4	–	3	–	1	7	–	3	–	1
Texas	4	–	4	–	0	5	–	5	–	1
Arkansas	3	–	4	–	1	5	–	5	–	1
Rice	2	–	6	–	0	3	–	8	–	0
SMU	2	–	6	–	0	3	–	8	–	0
TCU	0	–	8	–	0	0	–	11	–	0
+ – Conference co-champions; Rankings from AP Poll

The 1976 Texas A&M Aggies football team was an American football team that represented Texas A&M University as a member of the Southwest Conference (SWC) during the 1976 NCAA Division I football season. In their fifth year under head coach Emory Bellard, the team compiled an overall record of 10–2, with a mark of 6–2 in conference play, and finished third in the SWC.

== Schedule ==
Date	Opponent	Rank	Site	TV	Result	Attendance	Source
September 11	Virginia Tech*	No. 14	Kyle Field; College Station, TX		W 19–0	44,039	
September 18	Kansas State*	No. 11	Kyle Field; College Station, TX		W 34–14	50,027	
September 25	at Houston	No. 9	Rice Stadium; Houston, TX		L 10–21	70,001	
October 2	at Illinois*		Memorial Stadium; Champaign, IL		W 14–7	67,543	
October 9	No. 15 Texas Tech	No. 17	Kyle Field; College Station, TX (rivalry)		L 16–27	52,651	
October 16	Baylor		Kyle Field; College Station, TX (rivalry)		W 24–0	52,241	
October 23	Rice		Kyle Field; College Station, TX		W 57–34	47,354	
October 30	at SMU		Cotton Bowl; Dallas, TX	ABC-R	W 36–0	35,123	
November 13	at No. 13 Arkansas	No. 16	War Memorial Stadium; Little Rock, AR (rivalry)	ABC-N	W 31–10	47,000	
November 20	TCU	No. 11	Kyle Field; College Station, TX (rivalry)		W 59–10	44,055	
November 25	at Texas	No. 11	Memorial Stadium; Austin, TX (rivalry)	ABC-R	W 27–3	70,000	
January 2	vs. Florida*	No. 10	Sun Bowl; El Paso, TX (Sun Bowl)	CBS	W 37–14	33,250	
*Non-conference game; Rankings from AP Poll released prior to the game

== Personnel ==
1976 Texas A&M Aggies football team roster
Players
Coaches
Offense

Pos.	#	Name	Class
RB		Adger Armstrong
QB		Keith Baker
RB		David Brothers
OL		Mark Dennard
RB		Curtis Dickey	Fr
WR		Mike Floyd
OL		Matt Freeman
OL		Craig Glendenning
OL		Glen Glendenning
TE		Gary Haack
RB		Eddie Hardin
OL		Billy Lemons
TE		Russell Mikeska
OL		Frank Myers
OL		Cody Risien
QB		David Shipman
RB		Darrell Smith
OL		Dennis Swilley
WR		Doug Teague
WR		Randall Teate
QB		David Walker
QB		John Welborn
RB		George Woodard
RB		Gary Young

Defense

Pos.	#	Name	Class
DB		Charles Bell
DL		Phil Bennett
DL		Stacy Breihan
DL		Jimmy Dean
DL		Edgar Fields
DB		Carl Grulich
DB		Lester Hayes
DB		Eddie Heath
LB		Jesse Hunnicutt
LB		Robert Jackson
LB		Frankie Lemons
DL		Tank Marshall
LB		Kevin Monk
DB		William Thompson
LB		Grady Wilkerson
DB		Mike Williams
DB		Reggie Williams

Special teams

Pos.	#	Name	Class
P		David Appleby
K		Tony Franklin

Head coach

- Emory Bellard

Coordinators/assistant coaches

- Tom Wilson (OC)

Legend

- (C) Team captain
- (S) Suspended
- (I) Ineligible
- Injured
- Redshirt
