= 1976 Texas Longhorns football team =

American college football season

1976 Texas Longhorns football
- Conference: Southwest Conference
- Record: 5–5–1 (4–4 SWC)
- Head coach: Darrell Royal (20th season)
- Co-offensive coordinators: Don Breaux (2nd season); Pat Patterson (1st season)
- Defensive coordinator: Mike Campbell
- Home stadium: Memorial Stadium

1976 Southwest Conference football standings
	Conf.					Overall
Team	W		L		T	W		L		T
No. 4 Houston +	7	–	1	–	0	10	–	2	–	0
No. 13 Texas Tech +	7	–	1	–	0	10	–	2	–	0
No. 7 Texas A&M	6	–	2	–	0	10	–	2	–	0
Baylor	4	–	3	–	1	7	–	3	–	1
Texas	4	–	4	–	0	5	–	5	–	1
Arkansas	3	–	4	–	1	5	–	5	–	1
Rice	2	–	6	–	0	3	–	8	–	0
SMU	2	–	6	–	0	3	–	8	–	0
TCU	0	–	8	–	0	0	–	11	–	0
+ – Conference co-champions; Rankings from AP Poll

The 1976 Texas Longhorns football team was an American football team that represented the University of Texas as a member of the Southwest Conference (SWC) during the 1976 NCAA Division I football season. In their 20th year under head coach Darrell Royal, the team compiled an overall record of 5–5–1, with a mark of 4–4 in conference play, and finished fifth in the SWC. This was Royal's final year as head coach.

== Schedule ==
Date	Time	Opponent	Rank	Site	TV	Result	Attendance	Source
September 11	6:30 p.m.	Boston College*	No. 7	Alumni Stadium; Chestnut Hill, MA		L 13–14	30,476	
September 18	7:30 p.m.	North Texas State*	No. 19	Memorial Stadium; Austin, TX		W 17–14	60,130	
October 2	7:30 p.m.	at Rice		Rice Stadium; Houston, TX (rivalry)		W 42–15	57,000	
October 9	3:00 p.m.	vs. No. 3 Oklahoma*	No. 16	Cotton Bowl; Dallas, TX (Red River Shootout)	ABC	T 6–6	72,032	
October 23	7:30 p.m.	SMU	No. 13	Memorial Stadium; Austin, TX		W 13–12	50,000	
October 30	2:30 p.m.	at No. 6 Texas Tech	No. 15	Jones Stadium; Lubbock, TX (rivalry)		L 28–31	54,187	
November 6	3:30 p.m.	No. 19 Houston	No. 20	Memorial Stadium; Austin, TX		L 0–30	77,809	
November 13	2:00 p.m.	at TCU		Amon G. Carter Stadium; Fort Worth, TX (rivalry)		W 34–7	16,523	
November 20	2:00 p.m.	at Baylor		Baylor Stadium; Waco, TX (rivalry)		L 10–20	45,500	
November 25	7:30 p.m.	No. 11 Texas A&M		Memorial Stadium; Austin, TX (rivalry)	ABC	L 3–27	70,000	
December 4	7:00 p.m.	Arkansas		Memorial Stadium; Austin, TX (rivalry)	ABC	W 29–12	49,341	
*Non-conference game; Rankings from AP Poll released prior to the game

== Game summaries ==
=== vs Oklahoma ===
#3 Oklahoma Sooners (4–0) vs. #16 Texas Longhorns (2–1)

Quarter	1	2	3	4	Total
Texas	0	3	0	3	6
Oklahoma	0	0	0	6	6

at Cotton Bowl, Dallas, Texas

- Date: October 9
- Game time: 3:00 p.m.
- Game attendance: 70,032
- Box Score

Game information

First quarter

- No scoring

Second quarter

- TEX – Russell Erxleben 37-yard field goal, 0:20. Texas 3–0. Drive: 3 plays, 27 yards, 2:20.

Third quarter

- No scoring

Fourth quarter

- TEX – Russell Erxleben 41-yard field goal, 13:43. Texas 6–0. Drive: 8 plays, 57 yards, 3:37.
- OU – Horace Ivory 1-yard run (kick failed), 1:38. Tie 6–6. Drive: 10 plays, 37 yards, 3:45.

Top passers

- TEX – Mike Cordaro – 3/8, 43 yards, INT
- OU

Top rushers

- TEX – Earl Campbell – 27 rushes, 91 yards
- OU

Top receivers

- TEX – Alfred Jackson – 2 receptions, 26 yards
- OU

President Gerald Ford walked out with both coaches to midfield for the pregame coin toss

=== At Baylor ===
Texas Longhorns (4–3–1) at Baylor Bears (5–2–1)

Quarter	1	2	3	4	Total
Texas	3	0	0	7	10
Baylor	0	7	7	6	20

at Baylor Stadium, Waco, Texas

- Date: November 20
- Game time: 2:00 p.m.
- Game attendance: 45,500
- Box Score

Game information

First quarter

- TEX – Russell Erxleben 24-yard field goal, 5:30. Texas 3–0. Drive:

Second quarter

- BAY – Ronnie Lee 6-yard pass from Mark Jackson (Lester Belrose kick), 7:00. Baylor 7–3. Drive:

Third quarter

- BAY – Mark Jackson 7-yard run (Lester Belrose kick), 12:01. Baylor 14–3. Drive: 2 plays, 15 yards, 0:41.

Fourth quarter

- BAY – Lester Belrose 23-yard field goal, 14:54. Baylor 17–3. Drive:
- BAY – Lester Belrose 20-yard field goal, 7:59. Baylor 20–3. Drive:
- TEX – Raymond Clayborn 68-yard punt return (Russell Erxleben kick), 1:16. Baylor 20–10.

Top passers

- TEX – Mark McBath – 4/6, 138 yards, INT
- BAY –

Top rushers

- TEX – Jimmy Walker – 8 rushes, 27 yards
- BAY –

Top receivers

- TEX – Michael Lockett – 2 receptions, 75 yards
- BAY –

=== Texas A&M ===
#11 Texas A&M Aggies (8–2) at Texas Longhorns (4–4–1)

Quarter	1	2	3	4	Total
Texas A&M	0	9	11	7	27
Texas	0	3	0	0	3

at Memorial Stadium, Austin, Texas

- Date: November 25
- Game time: 7:30 p.m.
- Game weather: Rain, 63 °F (17 °C)
- Game attendance: 75,000
- TV: ABC
- Box Score

Game information

First quarter

- No scoring

Second quarter

- A&M – Tony Franklin 21-yard field goal, 9:00. Texas A&M 3–0. Drive: 11 plays, 61 yards, 4:01.
- TEX – Russell Erxleben 42-yard field goal, 6:41. Tie 3–3. Drive: 7 plays, 70 yards, 2:19.
- A&M – Curtis Dickey 8-yard run (kick failed), 0:31. Texas A&M 9–3. Drive: 13 plays, 85 yards, 6:10.

Third quarter

- A&M – George Woodard 1-yard run (run good), 10:29. Texas A&M 17–3. Drive: 7 plays, 20 yards, 3:23.
- A&M – Tony Franklin 57-yard field goal, 3:18. Texas A&M 20–3. Drive: 9 plays, 70 yards, 4:01.

Fourth quarter

- A&M – George Woodard 1-yard run (Tony Franklin kick), 10:57. Texas A&M 27–3. Drive: 3 plays, 6 yards, 1:22.

Top passers

- A&M –
- TEX – Mark McBath – 4/15, 52 yards, 3 INT

Top rushers

- A&M –
- TEX – Johnny Lam Jones – 20 rushes, 54 yards

Top receivers

- A&M –
- TEX – Alfred Jackson – 2 receptions, 40 yards

=== Arkansas ===
Arkansas Razorbacks (5–4–1) at Texas Longhorns (4–5–1)

Quarter	1	2	3	4	Total
Arkansas	0	0	6	6	12
Texas	3	7	3	16	29

at Memorial Stadium, Austin, Texas

- Date: December 4
- Game time: 7:00 p.m.
- Game weather: Clear; 59 °F (15 °C)
- Game attendance: 49,341
- Box Score

Game information

First quarter

- TEX – Russell Erxleben 37-yard field goal, 7:31. Texas 3–0. Drive: 7 plays, 63 yards, 7:02.

Second quarter

- TEX – Earl Campbell 1-yard run (Russell Erxleben kick), 7:32. Texas 10–0. Drive: 3 plays, 28 yards, 0:54.

Third quarter

- ARK – Steve Little 50-yard field goal, 11:55. Texas 10–3. Drive: 4 plays, 32 yards, 1:29.
- ARK – Steve Little 34-yard field goal, 9:09. Texas 10–6. Drive: 4 plays, 19 yards, 2:03.
- TEX – Russell Erxleben 49-yard field goal, 5:34. Texas 13–6. Drive: 7 plays, 81 yards, 3:35.

Fourth quarter

- TEX – Russell Erxleben 34-yard field goal, 12:54. Texas 16–6. Drive: 4 plays, 23 yards, 1:50.
- TEX – Mark McBath 12-yard run (kick failed), 8:03. Texas 22–6. Drive: 6 plays, 50 yards, 2:26.
- ARK – Clint Allen 2-yard run (pass failed), 5:00. Texas 22–12. Drive: 12 plays, 80 yards, 3:11.
- TEX – Earl Campbell 5-yard run (Russell Erxleben kick), 2:20. Texas 29–12. Drive: 6 plays, 54 yards, 2:37.

Top passers

- ARK
- TEX – Mark McBath – 1/3, 7 yards

Top rushers

- ARK
- TEX – Earl Campbell – 32 rushes, 131 yards, 2 TD

Top receivers

- ARK
- TEX – Alfred Jackson – 1 reception, 7 yards

Darrell Royal's final game as head coach

External videos
- Full game

== Personnel ==
1976 Texas Longhorns football team roster
Players
Coaches
Offense

Pos.	#	Name	Class
RB		Robert Butler
RB	20	Earl Campbell	Jr
RB		Alvin Cartwright
QB		Ted Costanzo
QB		Mike Cordaro
OL		Billy Gordon
TE		Gil Harris
OL		Rick Ingraham
WR		Alfred Jackson
OL		George James
RB		Jimmy Johnson
RB		Johnny Ham Jones
RB		Johnny Lam Jones
TE		Mike Lockett
QB		Mark McBath
TE		Joe Samford
QB		Richard Slaydon
OL		David Studdard
RB		Ivey Suber
RB		Jimmy Walker
OL		Charles Wilcox
OL		Jim Yarbrough

Defense

Pos.	#	Name	Class
DB		Glenn Blackwood
DL		Rick Burleson
DL		Tim Campbell
DB		Ricky Churchman
DB		Raymond Clayborn
DB		Steve Collier
LB		Morgan Copeland
LB		Rick Fenlaw
DL		Jim Gresham
LB		Bill Hamilton
DB		Paul Jette
DB		Johnnie Johnson
LB		Lionell Johnson
DL		Ernest Lee
DT	99	Steve McMichael	Fr
DL		Brad Shearer

Special teams

Pos.	#	Name	Class
K, P		Russell Erxleben

Head coach

- Darrell Royal

Coordinators/assistant coaches

- Don Breaux co-OC)
- Jack Burns
- Mike Campbell (DC)
- Ken Dabbs
- Tim Doerr
- Spike Dykes
- Sonny Everett
- David McWilliams
- Pat Patterson (co-OC)
- Prenis Williams

Legend

- (C) Team captain
- (S) Suspended
- (I) Ineligible
- Injured
- Redshirt
