= Wilson Whitley =

American football player (1955–1992)

No. 75
- Position: Defensive tackle

Personal information
- Born: April 28, 1955; Brenham, Texas, U.S.
- Died: October 27, 1992 (aged 37); Marietta, Georgia, U.S.
- Listed height: 6 ft 3 in (1.91 m)
- Listed weight: 265 lb (120 kg)

Career information
- High school: Brenham (TX)
- College: Houston (1973–1976)
- NFL draft: 1977: 1st round, 8th overall pick

Career history
- Cincinnati Bengals (1977–1982)

Awards and highlights
- Lombardi Award (1976); Knute Rockne Memorial Trophy (1976); Consensus All-American (1976); SWC Defensive Player of the Year (1976); First-team All-SWC (1976); Houston Cougars No. 78 retired

Career NFL statistics
- Sacks: 11.5
- Fumble recoveries: 5
- Interceptions: 1
- Stats at Pro Football Reference
- College Football Hall of Fame

Wilson Carl Whitley Jr. (May 28, 1955 – October 27, 1992) was an American professional football defensive tackle who played in the National Football League (NFL). He played college football for the Houston Cougars, where he was named a consensus All-American under defensive coordinator Don Todd. He led the Cougars to the Southwest Conference championship in during Houston's first season as a conference member and won the 1976 Lombardi Award as the nation's top lineman. Former President Gerald Ford presented him the award. He was later named to the 1970s Southwest Conference All-Decade Team.

== Professional career ==
Whitley was drafted in the first round of the 1977 NFL draft by the Cincinnati Bengals and started alongside another Lombardi Award winner, Ross Browner, for 6 seasons.

== Death ==
Whitley died at the age of 37, due to a heart attack.

== Honors ==
He is a 1998 inductee into University of Houston's Hall of Honor and was a perennial candidate for the College Football Hall of Fame until his selection in 2007.
