= Baylor–Houston football rivalry =

American college football rivalry

- Baylor Bears Houston Cougars
- First meeting: September 30, 1950; Baylor 34, Houston 7
- Latest meeting: November 29, 2025; Houston 31, Baylor 24
- Next meeting: November 28, 2026

Statistics
- Total meetings: 31
- All-time series: Tied: 15–15–1
- Largest victory: Baylor: 53–13 (1954), 47–7 (1995); Houston: 66–10 (1989)
- Longest win streak: Houston: 4 (1976–1979)
- Current win streak: Houston: 1 (2025–present)

Locations of Baylor and Houston

The Baylor–Houston football rivalry is a college football rivalry between the Baylor University Bears and the University of Houston Cougars. The rivalry dates back to 1950.

== Series history ==
After several matchups in the 1950s, the two teams played each other every year from 1976 to 1995, when both schools were part of the now-defunct Southwest Conference. The rivalry was especially competitive from 1976 to 1986, when Hall of Fame coaches Grant Teaff (Baylor) and Bill Yeoman (Houston) were coaching against each other, with Yeoman holding a 6–4–1 edge over Teaff in the head-to-head.

After the breakup of the Southwest Conference, the two teams would not play each other again until 2023, when Houston joined Baylor in the Big 12 Conference. Despite not playing each other in that time frame, the rivalry was still contentious, as Houston fans felt that Baylor had taken their spot in the creation of the Big 12 back in 1996 by leveraging their state political connections at the time so as to not be left out of the conference.

=== Notable games ===
September 11, 1976: In what was Houston's first game as a member of the Southwest Conference, the Cougars would come away with a 23–5 win over Baylor on their way to the conference title in their first year in the league.

November 4, 2023: Playing each other for the first time since the breakup of the Southwest Conference, Houston defeated Baylor 25–24 in overtime thanks to a game-winning two-point conversion run from quarterback Donovan Smith.

== Game results ==
Rankings are from the AP Poll released prior to the game.

Baylor victories	Houston victories	Tie games

No.	Date	Location	Winning team		Losing team	
1	September 30, 1950	Waco	Baylor	34	Houston	7
2	September 22, 1951	Houston	#13 Baylor	19	Houston	0
3	November 15, 1952	Houston	Houston	28	Baylor	6
4	November 14, 1953	Waco	Houston	37	#9 Baylor	7
5	September 18, 1954	Waco	Baylor	53	Houston	13
6	September 28, 1957	Waco	#11 Baylor	14	#14 Houston	6
7	September 22, 1962	Houston	Houston	19	Baylor	0
8	September 28, 1963	Waco	Baylor	27	Houston	0
9	September 11, 1976	Waco	Houston	23	Baylor	5
10	October 1, 1977	Houston	#19 Houston	28	Baylor	24
11	October 7, 1978	Waco	Houston	20	Baylor	18
12	October 6, 1979	Houston	#6 Houston	13	Baylor	10
13	October 4, 1980	Waco	#20 Baylor	24	Houston	12
14	October 3, 1981	Houston	Houston	24	Baylor	3
15	October 2, 1982	Waco	Tie	21	Tie	21
16	October 1, 1983	Houston	Baylor	42	Houston	21

No.	Date	Location	Winning team		Losing team	
17	October 6, 1984	Waco	Houston	27	Baylor	17
18	October 5, 1985	Houston	#19 Baylor	24	Houston	21
19	October 4, 1986	Waco	#13 Baylor	27	Houston	13
20	October 3, 1987	Houston	Baylor	30	Houston	18
21	October 1, 1988	Waco	Houston	27	Baylor	24
22	October 7, 1989	Houston	#12 Houston	66	Baylor	10
23	October 6, 1990	Waco	#13 Houston	31	Baylor	15
24	October 5, 1991	Houston	#11 Baylor	38	Houston	21
25	October 17, 1992	Waco	Baylor	29	Houston	23
26	October 2, 1993	Houston	Houston	24	Baylor	3
27	October 29, 1994	Waco	Baylor	52	Houston	13
28	October 14, 1995	Houston	Baylor	47	Houston	7
29	November 4, 2023	Waco	Houston	25	Baylor	24 ^{OT}
30	November 23, 2024	Houston	Baylor	20	Houston	10
31	November 29, 2025	Waco	Houston	31	Baylor	24
Series: Tied 15–15–1

== See also ==
- List of NCAA college football rivalry games
