= 1976 Arkansas Razorbacks football team =

American college football season

1976 Arkansas Razorbacks football
- Conference: Southwest Conference
- Record: 5–5–1 (3–4–1 SWC)
- Head coach: Frank Broyles (19th season)
- Captain: Seniors
- Home stadium: Razorback Stadium; War Memorial Stadium

1976 Southwest Conference football standings
	Conf.					Overall
Team	W		L		T	W		L		T
No. 4 Houston +	7	–	1	–	0	10	–	2	–	0
No. 13 Texas Tech +	7	–	1	–	0	10	–	2	–	0
No. 7 Texas A&M	6	–	2	–	0	10	–	2	–	0
Baylor	4	–	3	–	1	7	–	3	–	1
Texas	4	–	4	–	0	5	–	5	–	1
Arkansas	3	–	4	–	1	5	–	5	–	1
Rice	2	–	6	–	0	3	–	8	–	0
SMU	2	–	6	–	0	3	–	8	–	0
TCU	0	–	8	–	0	0	–	11	–	0
+ – Conference co-champions; Rankings from AP Poll

The 1976 Arkansas Razorbacks football team represented the University of Arkansas in the Southwest Conference (SWC) during the 1976 NCAA Division I football season. In their 19th and final year under head coach Frank Broyles, the Razorbacks compiled a 5–5–1 record (3–4–1 against SWC opponents), finished in sixth place in the SWC, and outscored their opponents by a combined total of 220 to 204. After opening the season with five wins in the first six games, the Razorbacks went 0–4–1 in their final five games after a number of starters suffered season-ending injuries.

Ben Cowins averaged 6.3 yards per carry in 1976, the fourth-highest average in the nation. Steve Little averaged 44.4 yards per punt, the seventh-best nationally.

== Schedule ==
Date	Opponent	Rank	Site	TV	Result	Attendance	Source
September 11	Utah State*	No. 13	War Memorial Stadium; Little Rock, AR		W 33–16	50,536	
September 18	Oklahoma State*	No. 12	War Memorial Stadium; Little Rock, AR		W 16–10	55,103	
September 25	Tulsa*	No. 12	Razorback Stadium; Fayetteville, AR		L 3–9	40,563	
October 2	at TCU		Amon G. Carter Stadium; Fort Worth, TX		W 46–14	37,186	
October 23	at No. 14 Houston	No. 15	Rice Stadium; Houston, TX		W 14–7	47,192	
October 30	Rice	No. 14	Razorback Stadium; Fayetteville, AR		W 41–16	43,908	
November 6	at Baylor	No. 12	Baylor Stadium; Waco, TX		T 7–7	47,900	
November 13	No. 16 Texas A&M	No. 13	War Memorial Stadium; Little Rock, AR (rivalry)	ABC	L 10–31	47,000	
November 20	vs. SMU		State Fair Stadium; Shreveport, LA		L 31–35	32,000	
November 27	No. 9 Texas Tech		War Memorial Stadium; Little Rock, AR (rivalry)		L 7–30	41,327	
December 4	at Texas		Memorial Stadium; Austin, TX (rivalry)	ABC	L 12–29	49,341	
*Non-conference game; Rankings from AP Poll released prior to the game

== Personnel ==
1976 Arkansas Razorbacks football team roster
Players
Coaches
Offense

Pos.	#	Name	Class
RB		Clint Allen
WR		Doug Barwegen
TE		Mickey Billingsley
WR		Donnie Bobo
QB		Ron Calcagni	So
TE		Charles Clay
RB		Ben Cowins
RB		Jerry Eckwood
WR		Kevin Evans
WR		Gene Ratliff
WR		Robert Farrell
RB		Michael Forrest
OL		Leotis Harris
WR		Bruce Hay
OL		Steve Heim
WR		O.C. Jackson
OL		Greg Koch
QB		Martin Lemond
TE		Mike Massey
QB		Houston Nutt
QB		Tom Rystrom
QB		Mike Scott
OL		Gerald Skinner
OL		R.C. Thielemann
WR		Chris Warren
WR		Barnabas White

Defense

Pos.	#	Name	Class
DB		Bo Busby
DL	86	Dan Hampton	Jr
DL		Harvey Hampton
LB		William Hampton
LB		Larry Jackson
DB		Vaughn Lusby
DB		Patrick Martin
DL		Johnnie Meadors
DB		Howard Sampson
LB		Curtis Townsend
DL		Jimmy Walker
DL		Dale White
DB		Larry White
DL		Dennis Winston

Special teams

Pos.	#	Name	Class
K, P		Steve Little

Head coach

- Frank Broyles

Coordinators/assistant coaches

Legend

- (C) Team captain
- (S) Suspended
- (I) Ineligible
- Injured
- Redshirt
