= Rodney Allison =

American gridiron football player and coach (born 1956)

Biographical details
- Born: January 29, 1956 (age 70); Odessa, Texas, U.S.

Playing career
- 1974–1977: Texas Tech
- 1978: Toronto Argonauts
- Position: Quarterback

Coaching career (HC unless noted)
- 1979: Texas Tech (GA)
- 1980–1983: Texas Tech (RB)
- 1984–1986: Duke (RB)
- 1988–1989: Southern Miss (RB)
- 1990: Southern Miss (QB)
- 1991–1992: Southern Miss (AHC/RB)
- 1993–1996: Auburn (RB)
- 1997–1998: Auburn (OC/RB)
- 1999–2003: Clemson (DE)
- 2003–2008: Chattanooga

Head coaching record
- Overall: 17–51

Accomplishments and honors

Awards
- Southwest Conference MVP (1976); First-team All-SWC (1976)

Rodney Allison (born January 29, 1956) is an American former college football player and coach. He is currently the director of the Texas Tech letterman's organization, the Double T Varsity Club.

He was the former head football coach of the University of Tennessee at Chattanooga, holding the position from 2003 to 2008. He guided the Mocs to a 17–51 overall record. Allison is a graduate of Texas Tech University, receiving a bachelor's degree in Physical Education, where he played as the starting quarterback on the Texas Tech Red Raiders football team.

== Playing career ==
Allison started at the quarterback position for Texas Tech under head coach Steve Sloan for three years, from 1975 to 1977. During his tenure, he participated in three bowl appearances for the Red Raiders: the 1974 Peach Bowl, the 1976 Bluebonnet Bowl, and the 1977 Tangerine Bowl.

He received the MVP honor by the Southwest Conference after the 1976 season, after leading the Red Raiders to a 10–1 regular season record and a shared Southwest Conference title with Houston.

After graduating from Texas Tech, Allison was not drafted by the National Football League (NFL), but went on to play one year for the Toronto Argonauts of the Canadian Football League (CFL). During 1978, he played in 15 regular season games for the Argonauts, rushing for 49 yards on 13 attempts.

He was inducted into the Texas Tech Athletic Hall of Honor in 2003.

== Coaching career ==
Allison was hired by Texas Tech as a graduate assistant in 1979. In 1980 Allison was promoted to running backs coach, a position he would hold at several schools. After the 1983 season, Steve Sloan, Allison's former coach at Texas Tech hired him on as the running backs coach for Duke.

Allison coached at various positions at Southern Miss from 1988 to 1992. From 1993 to 1997, he was the running backs coach at Auburn, and took on the additional role of offensive coordinator during the 1998 season. From 1999 to 2003, he served as defensive ends coach for Clemson.

In 2003 Sloan, then the athletic director at the University of Tennessee at Chattanooga, hired Allison as the head coach of the Chattanooga Mocs.

On October 21, 2008, Chattanooga athletic director Rick Hart announced that Allison would be relieved of coaching duties after the 2008 season. Allison lead the Mocs to a 17–51 overall record.

== Administrative career ==
Allison was named the director of the Texas Tech letterman's association, the Double T Varsity Club, in 2013.

== Personal life ==
Allison is married and has two children, Ashleigh and Sloan. His son, Sloan, is named after Allison's former head coach, Steve Sloan.

== Head coaching record ==
Year	Team	Overall	Conference	Standing	Bowl/playoffs
Chattanooga Mocs (Southern Conference) (2003–2008)
2003	Chattanooga	3–9	3–5	T–6th	
2004	Chattanooga	2–9	2–5	T–5th	
2005	Chattanooga	6–5	3–4	T–5th	
2006	Chattanooga	3–8	2–5	T–5th	
2007	Chattanooga	2–9	2–5	7th	
2008	Chattanooga	1–11	0–8	9th	
Chattanooga:		17–51	12–32		
Total:		17–51			
