= Veer =

American football play

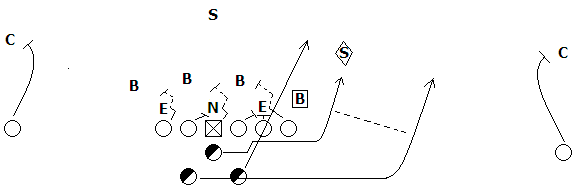
The Outside Veer (or "high dive") is shown vs. an Oklahoma defense (3–4 or 5–2). The square indicates the dive read while the diamond indicates the pitch read.

The Veer is an option running play often associated with option offenses in American football, made famous at the collegiate level by Bill Yeoman's Houston Cougars. It is currently run primarily at high school level, with some usage at the collegiate and the professional level where Veer's blocking scheme has been modified as part of the zone blocking system. The Veer is an effective ball-control offense that can help minimize mismatches in a game for a team. However, it can lead to turnovers with pitches and handoff option reads.

== Formations ==
The Veer can be run out of a variety of formations. However, it was primarily designed to be run out of the split-backed, aptly named veer formation. It has been used out of the I-formation (and its variants, including the Power-I and Maryland I) and the wishbone formation. Some variants of the triple option have now made the jump to the shotgun formation, which has become a popular option formation since Eric Crouch and the Nebraska Cornhuskers used the shotgun option during his 2001 Heisman campaign.

== How it works ==
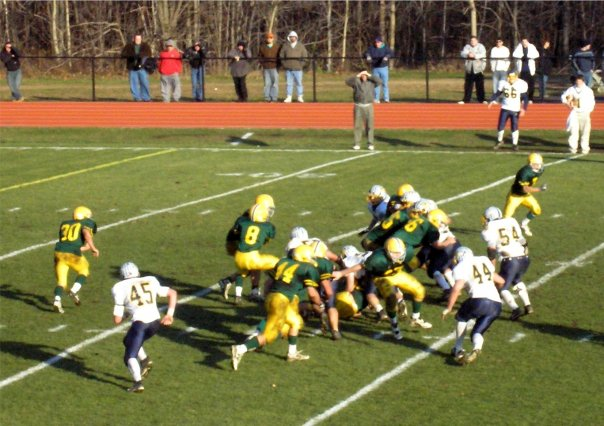
Morris Knolls High School of New Jersey running a typical veer play. In this picture, the quarterback, #8, is meeting his dive back. The other back, #30, is his pitch option.

The Veer option is generally regarded as a "triple option." It is designed as a three-back attack with one player taking a dive course, one taking a pitch course and another being a lead blocker on the perimeter of the offensive formation. The QB makes reads on defensive players and then distributes the ball according to the defensive reaction to the offense. A typical play proceeds as follows (we will assume that this is an "outside veer" going to the right side out of the split-back formation): the quarterback takes the snap. He then does what is called "opening up:" The quarterback goes from his two-point stance, facing forward, and takes (in this situation) his opposite side, left foot, and pivots ninety degrees on his right foot, extending the ball toward the sideline he is facing. The split-back halfback on the right side, who in this situation is the "dive back," goes forward into the line to where the quarterback is and meets in an area called the "mesh point." This is where the idea of the Veer begins to take shape: the offensive line has left one man unblocked here, most likely a defensive tackle (although it can be a linebacker) or even a defensive end.

This unblocked defender is being Read by the QB. The defender is forced to choose between tackling the dive back or the quarterback. The dive back explodes forward and puts his arms around the ball that is being extended but does not take it. The quarterback, in his open stance, is reading the man being veered, to decide whether to "pull" the ball from the dive back and go through the hole, or to give the dive back the ball and have him go through the hole. This is where the name of the offense, the veer, comes from. This is just one part of the four-part option. If the quarterback keeps the ball, he attempts to cut up the field with the opposite side halfback, who has been running right towards the dive back's original position. He is the pitchman.

He attempts to maintain proper pitch relation to the quarterback, technically a few yards outside the quarterback and moving laterally so that the quarterback may pitch the ball as he goes down the field. This entire action takes no longer than a few seconds.

The fourth player in the split-veer would be a wide receiver or tight end. His job, depending on the formation, would be to block the force player who is responsible for the flat on the side being attacked. The offense relies on the quarterback making the proper reads, turning up the field (if he decides to keep the ball) and gaining yardage. The dive back must remember not to take the football from the quarterback, rather the quarterback must give it to him. The pitchman must maintain proper spacing from the quarterback to ensure that the quarterback can make an effective pitch that can ensure more yardage.

== Origin ==
The College Football Hall of Fame credits Bill Yeoman with the invention of the veer formation. Yeoman ran that offense with the Houston Cougars beginning in the mid-1960s and continuing through his career at Houston, which concluded in 1986.

== Use ==
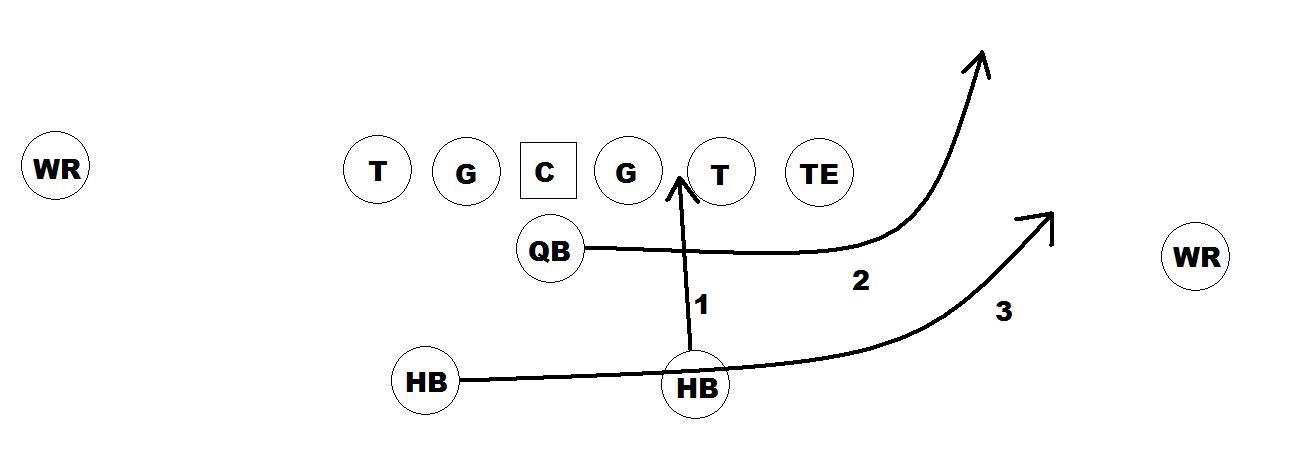
An example of an inside veer triple option.

When an offensive system is devised for a team, the coach must take into account his players, so the veer can be applied to several situations. It can be used for undersized players so that double teams and angles can be used to block defenders. It can be used to isolate defenders and create predictable responses to the offense's actions. If a team is very disciplined it can take advantage of an undisciplined defense that cannot execute their responsibilities precisely on each snap of the game.

The veer requires precision, execution and smarts. The ability of the QB to identify weakness in defensive alignment is paramount, as the veer can take quick advantage of a defensive misalignment. The veer can also be used with great effect when the offensive line is a strength of the team. Over time, the ability to pass out of the Veer has also been utilized depending on the quarterback's ability to "bounce" into a moving pocket to make short-range passes. The most effective methods of passing out of the Veer also places emphasis on the interior linemen's ability to "sell" the defense on a run block scheme. Short yardage or goal-line offensive situations are ideal for a Veer option pass play. The receivers that are the best options for a pass play out of the Veer are the first running back through the line who runs a "go" route isolating the frozen safety; the slot receiver who can release quickly from a block to run a skinny "go" route behind the cornerback or a tight end that can release out of his interior block and find an open seam underneath the lone safety. A third component of the Veer that comes with some passing success is the ability to run trick-or-gadget plays to take advantage of overly anxious defensive backs and over-pursuing linebackers. Once the ability to pass out of the Veer has proven successful, the countering of the Veer becomes more conventional and the defensive backs must respect the pass first before attacking the line of scrimmage.

The veer offense was adopted by Jack Lengyel, the new head coach of the Marshall University Thundering Herd before the start of the 1971 season after the 1970 team was killed in a plane crash. Lengyel believed that the veer option offense would be a better offense than the Power I offense he had used at the College of Wooster. Bobby Bowden, then the head coach of West Virginia, offered to tutor Lengyel and his coaches on the intricacies and nuances of the veer option offense. Lengyel installed Reggie Oliver at quarterback. The Young Thundering Herd of Marshall would win two games in 1971: a last-second win against Xavier in their first home game after the crash and the homecoming game against ranked Bowling Green.

== Counter-plays ==
In the Florida State-Houston game in 1968, Florida State brought the safeties up and they ignored the QB, running right past him at times, and crashed into the trailing back, usually Paul Gipson. This took the pitch option away. The Veer wasn't stopped but it was slowed. Florida State won the game 40–20.

Highly athletic defensive lines can also "bring the house" and penetrate the backfield of a veer option offense, disrupting the option read progression and forcing the quarterback to scramble and throw downfield, something which the offense is ill-equipped to do. Persistent backfield penetration can result in a preponderance of Fullback dive plays, which typically result in low gains, putting the offense in a cycle of low-yardage FB dives and incomplete passes under pressure, effectively neutering the "option" portion of the offense.

== Collegiate level ==
Because more media attention exists on the collegiate level, the collegiate teams who have run the Veer and its variants are far better known. Beyond the Texas teams of the late 1960s and early 1970s, the most famous and well-covered officially "Veer" team was the Houston squad led by Bill Yeoman. Yeoman's teams racked up thousands of yards on the ground and won four conference championships and 11 bowl games. His teams finished in the top 10 four times. Other famous Veer teams include University of Nebraska–Lincoln, who won several national titles in their Power-I offense, the United States Air Force Academy, United States Naval Academy, and NC State under Lou Holtz. The above-mentioned teams now run the official definition of a veer offense – that is, under center. Currently, the most successful team that runs the veer as their base offense is the United States Naval Academy, which runs the veer exclusively from the flexbone formation under Ken Niumatalolo, former assistant to Paul Johnson. Paul Johnson's version of the Veer has been quite successful, putting together substantial yardage totals against nearly every team encountering this offense. Critics of the offense often point out that bowl opponents have a 4-week time frame or longer to prepare for the offense, and this is a key factor in slowing it down.

Texas A&I (now Texas A&M Kingsville) used the veer exclusively in their domination of the Lone Star Conference and the NAIA during the mid-70s, not losing a game during a 40 plus win run. With the most decorated player in college football at the helm, Richard Ritchie, a wizard with the Veer, dominating play, running up scores such as 77-7, beating D1 University of Hawaii in their opening game at Aloha Stadium, then returning the next year to trounce them again. Not included in that streak the Javelina's became the first team to play a game or tour Europe which include a 5 game winning streak, playing in France, Germany and Austria against the #2 team in the NAIA, Henderson State.

The zone read, or shotgun veer play is now widely used throughout all levels of college football. A running back is lined up adjacent to the quarterback, and, at the snap, the quarterback opens up facing the running back. He reads the end on the same side as the running back. The running back is performing effectively the same motion as the dive back in a conventional veer, except he runs at the defensive end on the opposite side of the field. If the unblocked end on the running back's side (who, in a sense, is being veered) moves up the field towards the crossing running back, the quarterback pulls the ball from the running back and sprints by the end. If the veered end is waiting at his original position, the quarterback gives the ball to the running back. Many different formations are employed, and as a general rule, the option being employed is the base offense for the team, and not as a wrinkle.
