= 1977 Cotton Bowl Classic =

- 41st Cotton Bowl Classic
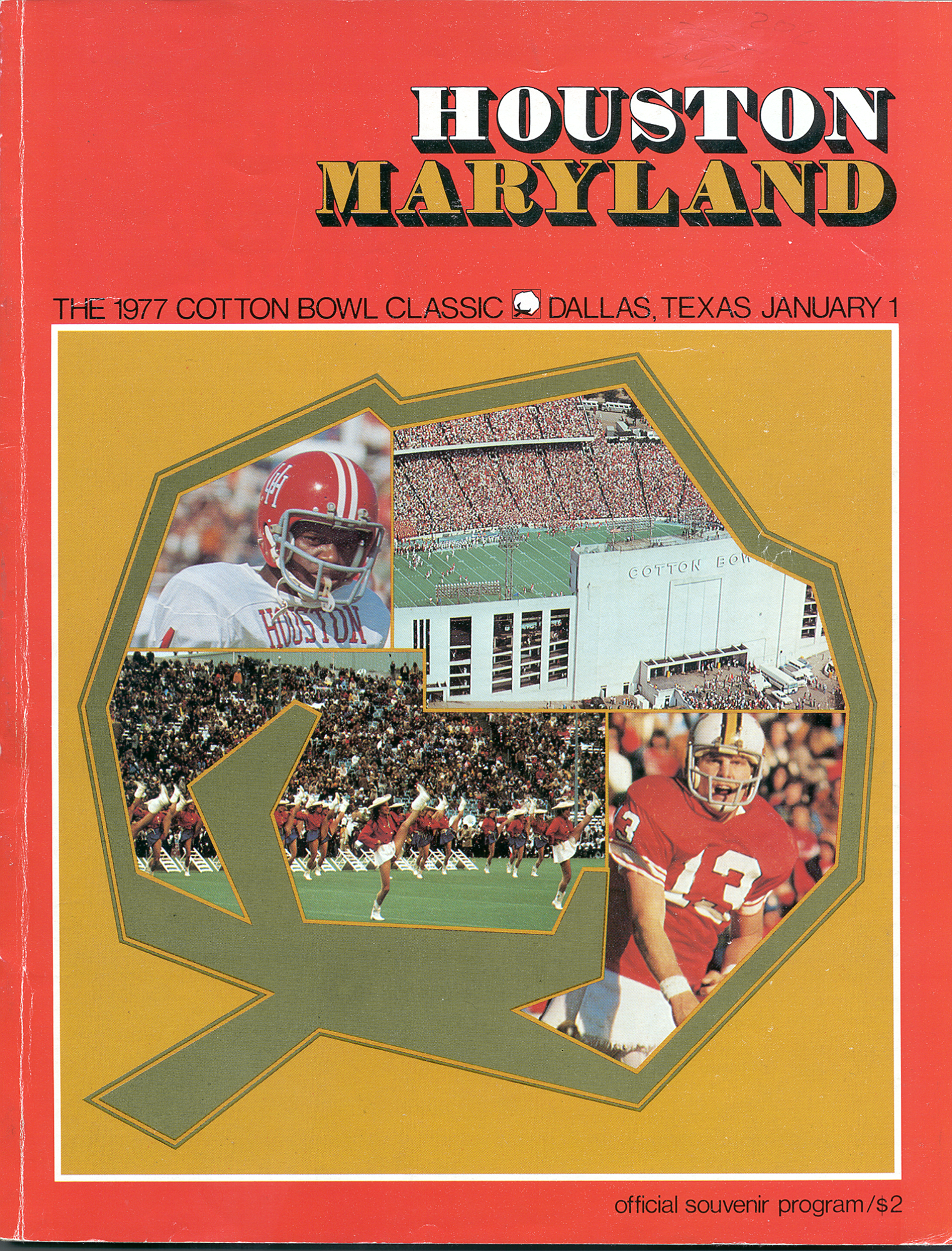
Maryland Terrapins	Houston Cougars
(11–0)	(9–2)
ACC	SWC
21	30
Head coach: Jerry Claiborne	Head coach: Bill Yeoman
AP / Coaches; 4 / 5	AP / Coaches; 6 / 7
	1	2	3	4	Total
Maryland	0	7	7	7	21
Houston	21	6	0	3	30
- Date: January 1, 1977
- Season: 1976
- Stadium: Cotton Bowl
- Location: Dallas, Texas
- MVP: RB Alois Blackwell (Houston); CB Mark Mohr (Houston)
- Referee: James Artley (SEC)
- Attendance: 58,500

United States TV coverage
- Network: CBS

The Cotton Bowl in Dallas, Texas, hosted the Cotton Bowl Classic.

The 1977 Cotton Bowl Classic matched the Maryland Terrapins and the Houston Cougars.

== Background ==
This was the Terps' fourth consecutive bowl appearance and their first Cotton Bowl Classic. They had finished with a perfect regular season in what was their most wins since the 1955 season, and won the Atlantic Coast Conference title for the third straight year. The Cougars were co-champions of the Southwest Conference in their first season with the SWC, their first conference title since the 1959 Missouri Valley Conference title. Both teams were making their first Cotton Bowl Classic appearance.

== Game summary ==
Houston jumped out to a 21–0 lead in the first quarter with rushing touchdowns from Dyral Thomas and two from Alois Blackwell, all three coming on Maryland mistakes, such as a missed 20 yard field goal, a blocked punt, and a fumble at their own 24. Maryland drove 49 yards and scored on a Mark Manges run to narrow it to 21–7 with nine minutes in the second quarter. But with the quarter about to end, Houston scored on a Don Bass catch from Danny Davis with 55 seconds remaining to have a 27–7 lead at halftime. Manges gave the Terps life when he threw a touchdown pass to Eric Sievers to narrow the lead late in the third quarter. Tim Wilson made it 27–21 with a touchdown run with 8:46 remaining in the fourth quarter. But Houston would hold on and not allow Maryland to score again, adding in a Lennard Coplin field goal with :18 remaining to seal the Terps' fate.

== Aftermath ==
The Cougars won three more SWC titles and appear in three more Cotton Bowl Classics in an 9-year span. The Terps did not win another ACC title until after Claiborne left for his alma mater, Kentucky, following the 1981 season. This remains the Terrapins' only Cotton Bowl Classic appearance, and Maryland did not play in another major bowl until the Orange Bowl following the 2001 season, the Terrapins' first under Ralph Friedgen.

== Statistics ==
Statistics	Maryland	Houston
First downs	17	20
Yards rushing	120	320
Yards passing	179	108
Total yards	299	428
Punts-Average	6-43.7	4-35.8
Fumbles-Lost	1-1	4-3
Interceptions	0	0
Penalties-Yards	8-80	5-22
