= Steve Sloan =

American football player and coach (1944–2024)

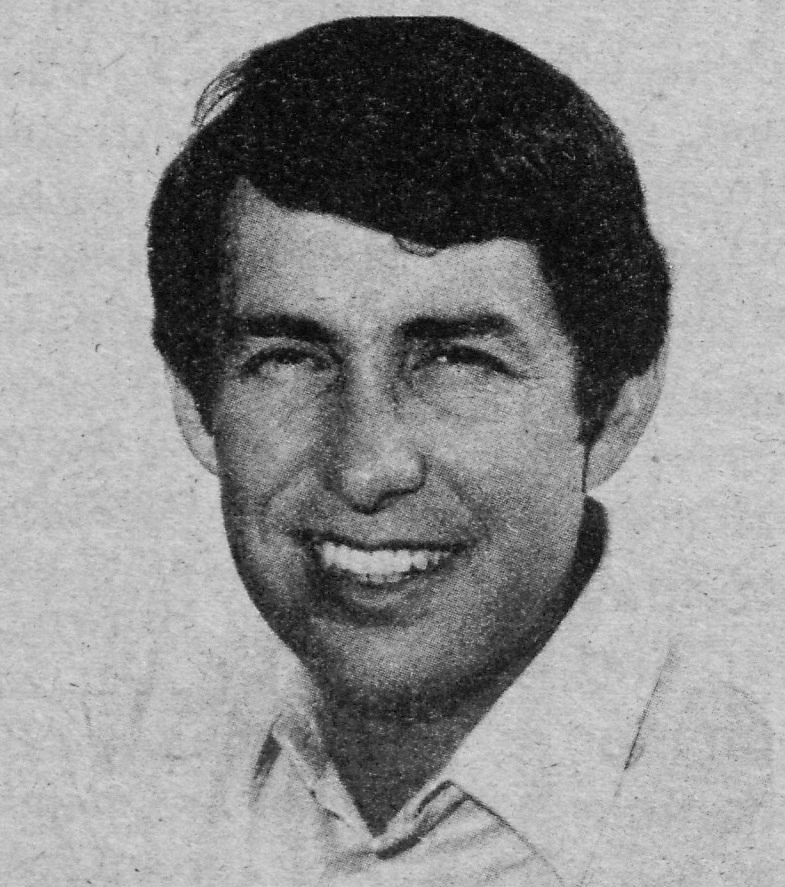
- Sloan, circa 1982

No. 14, 12
- Position: Quarterback

Personal information
- Born: August 19, 1944; Austin, Texas, U.S.
- Died: April 14, 2024 (aged 79); Orlando, Florida, U.S.
- Listed height: 6 ft 0 in (1.83 m)
- Listed weight: 185 lb (84 kg)

Career information
- High school: Bradley (Cleveland, Tennessee)
- College: Alabama (1962–1965)
- NFL draft: 1966: 11th round, 156th overall pick

Career history

Playing
- Atlanta Falcons (1966–1967)

Coaching
- Alabama (1968–1970) Assistant coach; Florida State (1971) Offensive coordinator; Georgia Tech (1972) Offensive coordinator; Vanderbilt (1973–1974) Head coach; Texas Tech (1975–1977) Head coach; Ole Miss (1978–1982) Head coach; Duke (1983–1986) Head coach; Vanderbilt (1990) Offensive coordinator

Operations
- Alabama (1987–1989) Athletic director; North Texas (1991–1993) Athletic director; UCF (1993–2002) Athletic director; Chattanooga (2002–2006) Athletic director

Awards and highlights
- As player: 2× National champion (1964, 1965); Sammy Baugh Trophy (1965); SEC Player of the Year (1965); 2× Second-team All-SEC (1964, 1965); As coach: SWC champion (1976); SEC Coach of the Year (1974); SWC Coach of the Year (1976)

Career NFL statistics
- Passing attempts: 31
- Passing completions: 10
- Completion percentage: 32.3%
- TD–INT: 0–4
- Passing yards: 134
- Passer rating: 7.4
- Stats at Pro Football Reference

Head coaching record
- Postseason: Bowl: 0–2–1 (.167)
- Career: 68–86–3 (.443)

Stephen Charles Sloan (August 19, 1944 – April 14, 2024) was an American professional football player who became a college football coach and athletics administrator. He played in college as a quarterback at the University of Alabama from 1962 to 1965 and then spent two seasons in the National Football League (NFL) with the Atlanta Falcons (1966–1967). Sloan then returned to his alma mater as an assistant coach (1968–1970), and then served one year each as an offensive coordinator at Florida State (1971) and Georgia Tech (1972). At Florida State he was on the staff with linebackers coach Bill Parcells. Sloan then got his first head coaching job at Vanderbilt University (1973–1974), where he brought Parcells with him, and at his next job at Texas Tech University (1975–1977), he made Parcells the defensive coordinator. Sloan then went on to the University of Mississippi (1978–1982), and Duke University (1983–1986), compiling a career record of 68–86–3. He returned to Vanderbilt to serve as offensive coordinator for one year (1990) before retiring from coaching. He also served as the athletic director at the University of Alabama (1987–1989), the University of North Texas (1991–1993), University of Central Florida (1993–2002), and the University of Tennessee at Chattanooga (2002–2006), before his retirement in 2006. In 2000, Sloan was inducted into the Tennessee Sports Hall of Fame. He died on April 14, 2024, at the age of 79.

== Early life ==
Steve Sloan was born in Austin, Texas, on August 19, 1944, to C.L. "Preacher" and Virginia Byrd Sloan. His father served in the U.S. Air Force, and the family moved regularly before settling in Cleveland, Tennessee, in 1953. Sloan attended Bradley Central High School where he was the quarterback on the football team, and also played baseball, basketball, and golf. He graduated in 1962 with academic honors. That year his school won state championships in football, basketball, and track. While at Bradley, Sloan earned all-state honors in football and basketball and was named one of the top prep golfers in the state.

== Playing career ==
Sloan played college football at the University of Alabama under legendary coach Paul "Bear" Bryant between 1962 and 1965. He arrived in Tuscaloosa in 1962, though was not eligible to play with the varsity team due to National Collegiate Athletic Association (NCAA) rules at the time. In his sophomore season with the Crimson Tide, Sloan was a backup to quarterback Joe Namath, but played in most games at defensive back. Sloan quarterbacked the Tide's final regular season game and the Sugar Bowl when Bryant benched Namath for disciplinary reasons. The 1963 Crimson Tide went 9–2 with a 12–7 victory over Ole Miss in the Sugar Bowl.

Sloan was the primary quarterback in his junior season in 1964 while Namath was injured. The 1964 team finished 10–1, won the Southeastern Conference title, and was named the consensus national champion. However, in the 1965 Orange Bowl versus Texas, Sloan was forced out of the game with injury. Namath came off the bench to win most valuable player honors despite Alabama losing, 21–17.

Following the departure of Namath to the American Football League, Sloan became Alabama's full-time starter for the 1965 season, in which Alabama repeated as SEC and national champions. The team finished 9–1–1 with a 39–28 victory over Nebraska in the 1966 Orange Bowl.

After college, Sloan was selected by the NFL's Atlanta Falcons in the 11th round of the 1966 NFL draft. He played sparingly as a back-up over the course of two seasons. In his brief NFL career, he only appeared in eight games, and only one as a starter. During those eight games, he completed 10 of 31 passes, for no touchdowns and four interceptions.

== Coaching career ==
In 1971, Sloan received his first coaching job as an offensive coordinator for the Florida State Seminoles. The following year, he moved to the Georgia Tech Yellow Jackets for the same position.

In 1973, Sloan took his first job as a head coach of the Vanderbilt Commodores. In his first season, Vanderbilt finished at 5–6, including a 1–5 record in conference play. During his second season, however, Vanderbilt finished at 7–3–1 and qualified for a post-season bowl game. The team was placed in the Peach Bowl against the Texas Tech Red Raiders. The two teams played to a 6–6 tie in the game. It was Vanderbilt's first bowl game since 1955 and second in school history.

The Texas Tech University athletic department offered Sloan head football coaching position in January 1975. Though Sloan originally declined, he took the job on January 2, 1975. Texas Tech was believed to have offered him a US$30,000 per year contract, as well as $11,000 from television show income. He took five of his assistant coaches with him to the Red Raiders program, including defensive coordinator Bill Parcells. In his three seasons with Texas Tech, Sloan compiled a 23–12 record.

In late 1977, Sloan took his third head coaching job with the Ole Miss Rebels football program. Sloan was head coach for five seasons at Ole Miss, winning 20 games, losing 34, and tying one. His best season came in 1978 when the Rebels finished at 5–6.

In December 1982, Sloan decided to leave Ole Miss to become the head football coach for the Duke Blue Devils football program. In his first season at Duke, Sloan led the Blue Devils to a 3–8 record, despite beginning the season 0–7. In his remaining three seasons, he compiled a 10–23 record before resigning. Steve Spurrier was named as his successor.

== Head coaching record ==
Year	Team	Overall	Conference	Standing	Bowl/playoffs	Coaches^{#}	AP^{°}
Vanderbilt Commodores (Southeastern Conference) (1973–1974)
1973	Vanderbilt	5–6	1–5	10th			
1974	Vanderbilt	7–3–2	2–3–1	T–7th	T Peach		
Vanderbilt:		12–9–2	3–8–1				
Texas Tech Red Raiders (Southwest Conference) (1975–1977)
1975	Texas Tech	6–5	4–3	4th			
1976	Texas Tech	10–2	7–1	T–1st	L Astro-Bluebonnet	13	13
1977	Texas Tech	7–5	4–4	T–4th	L Tangerine		
Texas Tech:		23–12	15–8				
Ole Miss Rebels (Southeastern Conference) (1978–1982)
1978	Ole Miss	5–6	2–4	T–7th			
1979	Ole Miss	4–7	3–3	T–5th			
1980	Ole Miss	3–8	2–4	7th			
1981	Ole Miss	4–6–1	1–5–1	9th			
1982	Ole Miss	4–7	0–6	T–9th			
Ole Miss:		20–34–1	8–22–1				
Duke Blue Devils (Atlantic Coast Conference) (1983–1986)
1983	Duke	3–8	3–4	T–5th			
1984	Duke	2–9	1–6	T–7th			
1985	Duke	4–7	2–5	T–6th			
1986	Duke	4–7	2–5	T–6th			
Duke:		13–31	8–20				
Total:		68–86–3					
National championship Conference title Conference division title or championship game berth
^{#}Rankings from final Coaches Poll.; ^{°}Rankings from final AP Poll.; Source:

== Books ==
- Sloan, Steve; James C. Hefley (1967). Calling Life's Signals: The Steve Sloan Story. Grand Rapids, Mich.: Zondervan Pub. House. LCCN 67030567. OCLC 3295821.
- Sloan, Steve (1975). A Whole New Ball Game. Nashville, Tenn.: Broadman Press. ISBN 0-8054-5559-0. OCLC 1858155.

== See also ==
- List of NCAA major college football yearly passing leaders
