= 1977 Minnesota Vikings season =

NFL team season

- General manager: Mike Lynn
- Head coach: Bud Grant
- Home stadium: Metropolitan Stadium

Results
- Record: 9–5
- Division place: 1st NFC Central
- Playoffs: Won Divisional Playoffs (at Rams) 14–7; Lost NFC Championship (at Cowboys) 6–23
- All-Pros: T Ron Yary (2nd team)
- Pro Bowlers: LB Matt Blair; RB Chuck Foreman; LB Jeff Siemon; G Ed White; WR Sammy White; T Ron Yary

Uniform
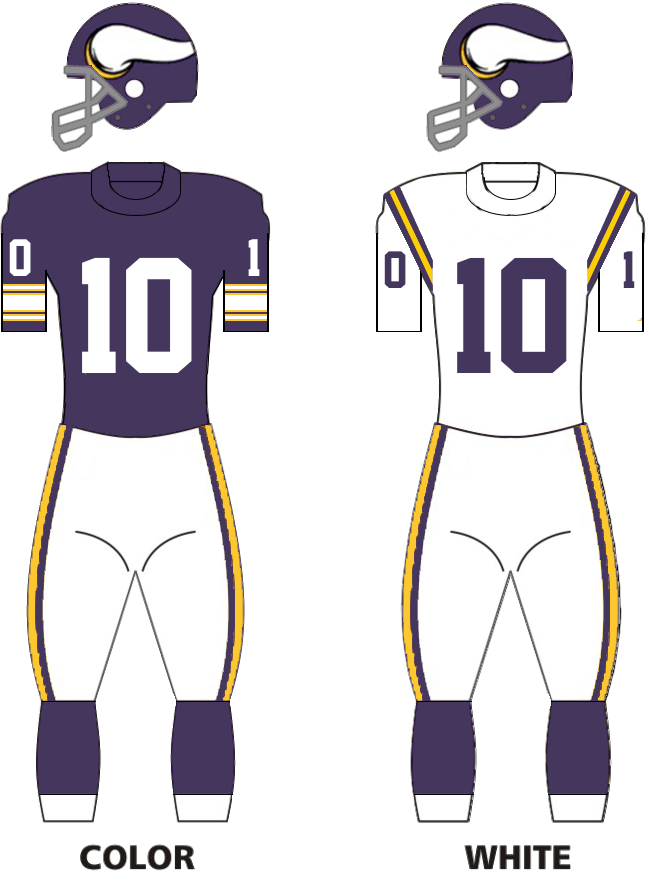

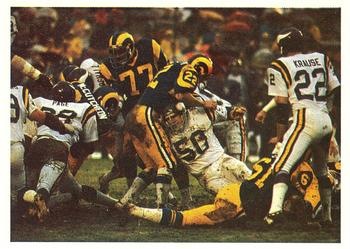
The Vikings' famed Purple People Eaters defensive line stopping a Rams rushing play in the 1977 NFC Divisional Playoff game.

The 1977 season was the Minnesota Vikings' 17th in the National Football League. After starting the season 5–3, the team's starting quarterback Fran Tarkenton broke his leg in week 9 and missed the rest of the season. Despite losing Tarkenton, the team managed to finish the season with a 9–5 record and went to the playoffs as winners of the NFC Central division title. They beat the Los Angeles Rams 14–7 in the Divisional Round in a game played in Los Angeles and termed the Mud Bowl, although the Vikings had lost 35–3 to the Rams in week 6. In the NFC Championship game played in Dallas, the Vikings lost to the Dallas Cowboys 23–6.

== Offseason ==
=== 1977 draft ===
Pro Bowler

1977 Minnesota Vikings Draft
Draft order		Player name	Position	College	Notes
Round	Selection	Player name	Position	College	Notes
1	27	Tommy Kramer	Quarterback	Rice	
2	55	Dennis Swilley	Guard	Texas A&M	
3	83	Tommy Hannon	Safety	Michigan State	
4	111	Traded to the Seattle Seahawks (Note: The Vikings traded a fourth-round selection (111th overall) to the Seattle Seahawks in exchange for WR Ahmad Rashad.)			
5	138	Ken Moore	Tight end	Northern Illinois	
6	166	Traded to the New England Patriots (Note: The Vikings traded a sixth-round selection (166th overall) and a 1976 eighth-round selection (235th overall) to the New England Patriots in exchange for C Doug Dumler.)			
7	194	Traded to the Cincinnati Bengals (Note: The Vikings traded a seventh-round selection (194th overall) to the Cincinnati Bengals in exchange for TE Orlando Nelson.)			
8	222	Clint Strozier	Defensive back	USC	
9	250	Scott Studwell	Linebacker	Illinois	
10	278	Dan Beaver	Placekicker	Illinois	
11	306	Keith Hartwig	Wide receiver	Arizona	
12	335	Jim Kelleher	Running back	Colorado	

== Personnel ==
=== Staff ===
1977 Minnesota Vikings staff
Front office: Principal owner/president – Max Winter; Chairman/treasurer – H. P. Skoglund; General manager – Mike Lynn; Coordinator–administration – Harley Peterson; Coordinator–football operations – Jerry Reichow; Director of player personnel – Frank Gilliam; Head coaches: Head coach – Bud Grant; Offensive coaches: Offensive coordinator – Jerry Burns; Offensive line – John Michels; Offensive backfield – Bus Mertes	Defensive coaches: Defensive coordinator – Neill Armstrong; Defensive line – Buddy Ryan; Linebackers – Jack Nelson

=== Roster ===
1977 Minnesota Vikings roster
Quarterbacks (QB): 9 Tommy Kramer; 19 Bob Lee; 10 Fran Tarkenton; Running backs (RB): 44 Chuck Foreman; 48 Sammy Johnson; 39 Mark Kellar; 33 Brent McClanahan; 35 Robert Miller; 36 Manfred Moore; Wide receivers (WR): 26 Bob Grim; 28 Ahmad Rashad; 85 Sammy White; Tight ends (TE): 84 Steve Craig; 38 Bob Tucker; 83 Stu Voigt	Offensive linemen (OL): 57 Doug Dumler C; 68 Charlie Goodrum G; 61 Wes Hamilton G; 78 Steve Riley T; 67 Dennis Swilley G; 53 Mick Tingelhoff C; 62 Ed White G; 73 Ron Yary T; Defensive linemen (DL): 81 Carl Eller DE; 76 Joey Jackson DT; 70 Jim Marshall DE; 77 Mark Mullaney DE; 88 Alan Page DT; 69 Doug Sutherland DT; 72 James White DT	Linebackers (LB): 59 Matt Blair OLB; 58 Wally Hilgenberg OLB; 54 Fred McNeill OLB; 50 Jeff Siemon MLB; 55 Scott Studwell MLB; Defensive backs (DB): 25 Nate Allen CB; 21 Joe Blahak CB; 20 Bobby Bryant CB; 45 Tommy Hannon FS; 22 Paul Krause FS; 29 Phil Wise SS; 23 Jeff Wright SS; 43 Nate Wright CB; Special teams (ST): 12 Neil Clabo P; 14 Fred Cox K	Reserve: 7 Rick Danmeier K (IR); Rookies in italics 45 active, 1 reserve

== Preseason ==
Week	Date	Opponent	Result	Record	Venue	Attendance
1	August 6	at Los Angeles Rams	W 22–17	1–0	Los Angeles Memorial Coliseum	55,168
2	August 13	Cleveland Browns	W 34–33	2–0	Metropolitan Stadium	45,370
3	August 19	at Baltimore Colts	L 7–29	2–1	Memorial Stadium	45,529
4	August 26	Miami Dolphins	W 33–7	3–1	Metropolitan Stadium	44,396
5	September 3	at Cincinnati Bengals	L 7–26	3–2	Riverfront Stadium	52,942
6	September 10	at Buffalo Bills	W 30–6	4–2	Rich Stadium	35,017

== Regular season ==
=== Schedule ===
Week	Date	Opponent	Result	Record	Venue	Attendance
1	September 18	Dallas Cowboys	L 10–16 (OT)	0–1	Metropolitan Stadium	47,678
2	September 24	at Tampa Bay Buccaneers	W 9–3	1–1	Tampa Stadium	66,272
3	October 2	Green Bay Packers	W 19–7	2–1	Metropolitan Stadium	47,143
4	October 9	Detroit Lions	W 14–7	3–1	Metropolitan Stadium	45,860
5	October 16	Chicago Bears	W 22–16 (OT)	4–1	Metropolitan Stadium	47,708
6	October 24	at Los Angeles Rams	L 3–35	4–2	Los Angeles Memorial Coliseum	62,414
7	October 30	at Atlanta Falcons	W 14–7	5–2	Atlanta–Fulton County Stadium	59,257
8	November 6	St. Louis Cardinals	L 7–27	5–3	Metropolitan Stadium	47,066
9	November 13	Cincinnati Bengals	W 42–10	6–3	Metropolitan Stadium	45,371
10	November 20	at Chicago Bears	L 7–10	6–4	Soldier Field	49,563
11	November 27	at Green Bay Packers	W 13–6	7–4	Lambeau Field	56,267
12	December 4	San Francisco 49ers	W 28–27	8–4	Metropolitan Stadium	40,745
13	December 11	at Oakland Raiders	L 13–35	8–5	Oakland–Alameda County Coliseum	52,771
14	December 17	at Detroit Lions	W 30–21	9–5	Silverdome	78,572

=== Game summaries ===
==== Week 2: at Tampa Bay Buccaneers ====
Week Two: Minnesota Vikings at Tampa Bay Buccaneers – Game summary

Quarter	1	2	3	4	Total
Vikings	0	2	7	0	9
Buccaneers	0	3	0	0	3

at Tampa Stadium, Tampa, Florida

- Date: September 24
- Game time: 8:00 p.m. EDT
- Game weather: 80 °F (27 °C)
- Game attendance: 66,272
- Referee: Fred Wyant
- Box score

Game information

First quarter

- No scoring plays

Second quarter

- MIN – Randy Hedberg sacked in end zone by Carl Eller for a safety. Vikings 2–0.
- TB – Allan Leavitt 18-yard field goal. Buccaneers 3–2.

Third quarter

- MIN – Chuck Foreman 31-yard pass from Fran Tarkenton (Fred Cox kick). Vikings 9–3.

Fourth quarter

- No scoring plays

Top passers

- MIN – Fran Tarkenton – 25/38, 223 yards, TD, 2 INT
- TB – Randy Hedberg – 4/14, 51 yards, 3 INT

Top rushers

- MIN – Chuck Foreman 14 rushes, 58 yards
- TB – Ricky Bell – 21 rushes, 66 yards

Top receivers

- MIN – Chuck Foreman – 4 receptions, 52 yards, TD
- TB – Morris Owens – 2 receptions, 26 yards

==== Week 3: vs Green Bay Packers ====
Week 3: Green Bay Packers at Minnesota Vikings

Quarter	1	2	3	4	Total
Packers	7	0	0	0	7
Vikings	7	6	0	6	19

at Metropolitan Stadium, Minnesota

- Date: October 2, 1977
- Game time: 1:00 p.m. CST
- Game weather: Overcast, 47 °F (8 °C)
- TV announcers (CBS): Tim Ryan and Johnny Unitas
- Pro-Football-Reference.com

Game information

First quarter

- GB – Steve Odom 95-yard pass from Lynn Dickey (Chester Marcol kick). Packers 7–0.
- MIN – Sammy White 16-yard pass from Fran Tarkenton (Fred Cox kick). Tied 7–7.

Second quarter

- MIN – Chuck Foreman 3-yard run. Vikings 13–7.

Third quarter

- No scoring plays.

Fourth quarter

- MIN – Sammy Johnson 2-yard run. Vikings 19–7.

Top passers

- GB – Lynn Dickey – 8/20, 143 yards, TD
- MIN – Fran Tarkenton – 19/27, 184 yards, TD

Top rushers

- GB – Eric Torkelson – 8 rushes, 34 yards
- MIN – Sammy Johnson – 12 rushes, 65 yards, TD

Top receivers

- GB – Steve Odom – 1 reception, 95 yards, TD
- MIN – Sammy White – 5 receptions, 73 yards, TD

==== Week 7: at Atlanta Falcons ====
- Television network: CBS
- Announcers: Pat Summerall and Tom Brookshier

Minnesota's Fran Tarkenton threw a 54-yard touchdown pass to Sammy White to tie the game in the second quarter, then tossed a 6-yard scoring pass to Bob Tucker in the fourth quarter after Chuck Foreman's 51-yard run to salvage a big win for the Vikings. The Falcons took the lead early lead on a 49-yard scoring pass from Scott Hunter to Greg McCrary.

==== Week 10: at Chicago Bears ====
Week 10: Minnesota Vikings at Chicago Bears – Game summary

Quarter	1	2	3	4	Total
Vikings	0	0	7	0	7
Bears	0	10	0	0	10

at Soldier Field, Chicago

- Date: Sunday, November 20
- Game time: 12:00 p.m.
- Game weather: 48 °F (9 °C)
- Referee: Gordon McCarter
- TV announcers (CBS): Lindsey Nelson, Paul Hornung
- Pro-Football-Reference.com

Game information

First quarter

- No scoring plays.

Second quarter

- CHI – Walter Payton 1-yard run (Bob Thomas kick). Bears 7–0.
- CHI – Bob Thomas 37-yard field goal. Bears 10–0.

Third quarter

- MIN – Matt Blair 10-yard return of blocked punt (Fred Cox kick). Bears 10–7.

Fourth quarter

- No scoring plays.

Top passers

- MIN – Bob Lee – 12/24, 116 yards, 2 INT
- CHI – Bob Avellini – 4/6, 33 yards, INT

Top rushers

- MIN – Chuck Foreman – 14 rushes, 54 yards
- CHI – Walter Payton – 40 rushes, 275 yards, TD

Top receivers

- MIN – Sammy White – 3 receptions, 31 yards
- CHI – James Scott – 2 receptions, 22 yards

==== Week 11: at Green Bay Packers ====
Week 11: Minnesota Vikings at Green Bay Packers – Game summary

Quarter	1	2	3	4	Total
Vikings	0	13	0	0	13
Packers	6	0	0	0	6

at Lambeau Field, Green Bay, Wisconsin

- Date: Sunday, November 27
- Game time: 1:00 p.m.
- Game weather: 10 °F (−12 °C)
- Referee: Don Wedge
- TV announcers (CBS): Gary Bender and Johnny Unitas
- Pro-Football-Reference.com

Game information

First quarter

- GB – David Whitehurst 3-yard run (kick failed). Packers 6–0.

Second quarter

- MIN – Sammy White 40-yard pass from Bob Lee (Fred Cox kick). Vikings 7–6.
- MIN – Fred Cox 21-yard field goal. Vikings 10–6.
- MIN – Fred Cox 31-yard field goal. Vikings 13–6.

Third quarter

- No scoring plays.

Fourth quarter

- No scoring plays.

Top passers

- MIN – Bob Lee – 5/8, 68 yards, TD
- GB – David Whitehurst – 6/23, 75 yards, 2 INT

Top rushers

- MIN – Chuck Foreman – 26 rushes, 101 yards
- GB – Eric Torkelson – 13 rushes, 53 yards

Top receivers

- MIN – Sammy White – 1 reception, 40 yards, TD
- GB – Bert Askson – 1 reception, 34 yards

==== Week 13: at Oakland Raiders ====
Week 13: Minnesota Vikings at Oakland Raiders – Game summary

Quarter	1	2	3	4	Total
Vikings	0	7	0	6	13
Raiders	21	0	7	7	35

at Oakland-Alameda County Coliseum, Oakland, California

- Date: Sunday, December 11
- Game time: 4:00 p.m.
- Game weather: 53 °F (12 °C)
- Referee: Fred Wyant
- TV announcers (CBS): Vin Scully and Alex Hawkins
- Pro-Football-Reference.com

Game information

First quarter

- OAK – Mark van Eeghen 2-yard run (Errol Mann kick). Raiders 7–0.
- OAK – Cliff Branch 10-yard pass from Ken Stabler (Errol Mann kick). Raiders 14–0.
- OAK – Willie Hall 2-yard fumble recovery (Errol Mann kick). Raiders 21–0.

Second quarter

- MIN – Nate Wright 27-yard fumble recovery (Fred Cox kick). Raiders 21–7.

Third quarter

- OAK – Cliff Branch 32-yard pass from Ken Stabler (Errol Mann kick). Raiders 28–7.

Fourth quarter

- OAK – Carl Garrett 2-yard pass from Ken Stabler (Errol Mann kick). Raiders 35–7.
- MIN – Sammy White 11-yard pass from Tommy Kramer (kick failed, wide right). Raiders 35–13.

Top passers

- MIN – Tommy Kramer – 16/34, 177 yards, TD, 3 INT
- OAK – Ken Stabler – 10/15, 143 yards, 3 TD

Top rushers

- MIN – Chuck Foreman – 11 rushes, 48 yards
- OAK – Mark van Eeghen – 28 rushes, 112 yards, TD

Top receivers

- MIN – Sammy White – 5 reception, 73 yards, TD
- OAK – Cliff Branch – 4 reception, 95 yards, 2 TD

=== Standings ===
NFC Central
	W	L	T	PCT	DIV	CONF	PF	PA	STK
Minnesota Vikings^{(3)}	9	5	0	.643	6–1	8–4	231	227	W1
Chicago Bears^{(4)}	9	5	0	.643	6–1	8–4	255	253	W6
Detroit Lions	6	8	0	.429	2–5	4–8	183	252	L1
Green Bay Packers	4	10	0	.286	2–5	4–7	134	219	W1
Tampa Bay Buccaneers	2	12	0	.143	0–4	2–11	103	223	W2

== Postseason ==
Week	Date	Opponent	Result	Venue	Attendance
Divisional	December 26	at Los Angeles Rams	W 14–7	Los Angeles Memorial Coliseum	62,538
Conference	January 1	at Dallas Cowboys	L 6–23	Texas Stadium	61,968

== Statistics ==
=== Team leaders ===
Category	Player(s)	Value
Passing yards	Fran Tarkenton	1,734
Passing touchdowns	Fran Tarkenton	9
Rushing yards	Chuck Foreman	1,112
Rushing touchdowns	Chuck Foreman	6
Receiving yards	Sammy White	760
Receiving touchdowns	Sammy White	9
Points	Chuck Foreman; Sammy White	54
Kickoff return yards	Manfred Moore	524
Punt return yards	Manfred Moore	277
Interceptions	Bobby Bryant	4

=== League rankings ===
Category	Total yards	Yards per game	NFL rank (out of 28)
Passing offense	2,368	169.1	6th
Rushing offense	1,821	130.1	21st
Total offense	4,189	299.2	14th
Passing defense	1,581	112.9	3rd
Rushing defense	2,218	158.4	21st
Total defense	3,799	271.4	11th
