= 1977 Tampa Bay Buccaneers season =

NFL team 2nd season

- Owner: Hugh Culverhouse
- Head coach: John McKay
- Home stadium: Tampa Stadium

Results
- Record: 2–12
- Division place: 5th NFC Central
- Playoffs: Did not qualify
- Pro Bowlers: None
- Team MVP: Lee Roy Selmon

The 1977 Tampa Bay Buccaneers season was the franchise's second season in the National Football League, the second playing their home games at Tampa Stadium and the second under head coach John McKay. After one lone season in the AFC, it was the franchise's first season in the NFC, competing in the Central division. It continued the losing streak that encompassed the entire 1976 season, and extended it to 26 games, second only to the Chicago Cardinals who lost a total of 29 games in a row from 1942 to 1945 (including the franchise's one-season merger with the Pittsburgh Steelers as Card-Pitt). Fear of becoming the Buccaneers’ first victim provided motivation to opposing teams. It took nearly two seasons for the Buccaneers to achieve their first franchise victory, a 33–14 win over the New Orleans Saints in the second-to-last game of the year. The next week, the Bucs earned their first home victory, over the St. Louis Cardinals.

== Offseason ==
Rumors began to circulate alleging that the Buccaneers were a disorganized and confused organization, and returning veterans were promised that changes were forthcoming. It was pointed out that none of the team's administrative staff had any experience in their position, at the same time that a team of rookie players and coaches was being fielded. These problems were addressed with the firings and resignations of six coaches and administrators at the beginning of the year. Head coach John McKay used the opportunity to take control of more aspects of the organization, and selected replacements of his choosing. McKay was criticized over his handling of the players and was accused of cutting veterans who could have helped the team, such as Ira Gordon, over ego conflicts. A perception arose that McKay was intolerant toward challenges to his authority, as he frequently cut players who argued with him and surrounded himself with former USC players and staff. Concern that McKay preferred players who would keep their mouth shut, rather than players with talent, produced resentment among veterans who worried that their limited career spans would be spent with a losing team. Critics accused McKay of attempting a style of play that was more appropriate for the college game, and noted Don Shula's comment that preparing for the Buccaneers was like preparing to play USC. Reporters who covered the team indicated that McKay did not respond to the losing streak with the humor that it was hoped he would, but that he became an "old grouch" who complained about his coaching assistants, game-day officiating, and opposing coaches who he accused of running up the score. This was reflected in a bitter tone that had crept into McKay's trademark humor, with comments such as "I keep a picture of O. J. Simpson by my side at all times to remind me of the days when I knew how to coach".

Dennis Fryzel, coach of the Buccaneers’ much-criticized special teams, was replaced by USC offensive line coach Skip Husbands, who became the fifth USC assistant to join McKay in Tampa. Head trainer Dave Kendall was replaced by Northwestern University trainer Tom Oxley. Oxley was immediately given the task of rehabilitating the previous season's seventeen players who finished the year on injured reserve. A surprise trade brought Chicago Bears backup quarterback and Tampa native Gary Huff to the team, while incumbent quarterback Steve Spurrier was placed on waivers. Spurrier and McKay had often feuded during the previous season. McKay stated that cutting Spurrier meant that he would have a choice of teams with whom to sign. A rumored attempt to make a deal for Cleveland Browns quarterback Mike Phipps was denied, although a trade was later made for Philadelphia Eagles quarterback Mike Boryla.

=== NFL draft ===
1977 Tampa Bay Buccaneers draft
| Round | Pick | Player | Position | College | Notes |
| 1 | 1 | Ricky Bell | RB | USC | |
| 2 | 29 | Dave Lewis * | LB | USC | |
| 3 | 57 | Charley Hannah | DE | Alabama | |
| 8 | 196 | Randy Hedberg | QB | Minot State | |
| 9 | 224 | Byron Hemingway | LB | Boston College | |
| 9 | 251 | Larry Mucker | WR | Arizona State | from Oakland |
| 10 | 252 | Robert Morgan | RB | Florida | |
| 10 | 267 | Aaron Ball | LB | Cal State Fullerton | from San Francisco |
| 11 | 280 | Chuck Rodgers | DB | North Dakota State | |
| 12 | 308 | Chip Sheffield | WR | Lenoir–Rhyne | |
Made roster * Made at least one Pro Bowl during career

- Charley Hannah played defensive end in college, but was converted to offensive guard in the pros.

==== Draft trades ====
A pair of trades gained three picks for the team, which helped compensate for the lack of selections in rounds 4–7. Cedric Brown went to the Oakland Raiders in return for selections in rounds 6 and 9, while guard John Miller brought a tenth-round pick from the San Francisco 49ers. Brown eventually returned to the Buccaneers after being waived from Oakland. The two sixth-round picks were traded to the Chicago Bears in return for quarterback Gary Huff, while the fifth-round pick was traded to the Miami Dolphins for the rights to linebacker Ray Nettles. The other two selections had been traded during the previous season: the fourth-round pick had gone to the Cincinnati Bengals for running back Charlie Davis, and the seventh-round pick had been traded to the New York Jets for linebacker Richard Wood.

==== Draft selections ====
The Buccaneers held the first pick in the 1977 NFL draft, and chose Ricky Bell of USC. This was the first time since O. J. Simpson in 1969 that a running back was taken with the first overall draft pick. Bell was signed to a contract the same day and quickly reunited with his college teammate Dave Lewis, who was taken in the second round. Lewis became the eleventh former USC player on the Tampa Bay roster, and when given the news that he was now a Buccaneer, said, "You mean a Trojan Buccaneer". No other NFL team had as many players from any one school, and the Buccaneers received the unwanted nickname of "USC East". Scouting services regarded Lewis poorly, but the Buccaneers rated him as the best linebacker in the draft. McKay would later call Lewis "the steal of the draft", and say that he would be a top five pick if the draft were held over again. The previous year's offensive line woes were not addressed in the draft, as the team had no picks in the middle rounds, and didn't feel that there were any linemen worth taking in the later rounds. Third round pick Charley Hannah, brother of future Hall of Fame tackle John Hannah, would eventually be converted from defensive end to offensive guard.

== Preseason ==
The expected preseason quarterback battle between Mike Boryla and Gary Huff failed to occur, as both suffered knee injuries in the first two preseason games. (Boryla's injury knocked him out for the entire season.) This left the team with just two healthy quarterbacks: Parnell Dickinson, who had less than a full year's experience due to a knee injury, and rookie Randy Hedberg. Jeb Blount was eventually claimed off waivers from the Oakland Raiders. Hedberg won the starting job with strong performances in the final two preseason games. Dickinson proved prone to throwing interceptions, due to trouble reading defenses and a tendency to throw late passes over the middle, and was cut from the team during training camp. The former Minot State quarterback Hedberg's surprising rise from fourth-stringer to opening-day starter led to shouts of "Why not Minot?", sales of "RH Positive" T-shirts, and the addition of a radio affiliate in faraway North Dakota.

A building strategy that emphasized developing young players instead of playing veterans who didn't fit into the team's future plans led the team to trade veteran offensive tackle Mike Current to the Miami Dolphins for troubled former first-round draft pick Darryl Carlton. McKay called Carlton "amazing", and said that "he just doesn't make mental mistakes". Dan Medlin and Jeff Winans, a pair of guards obtained from the Raiders via trade, were touted as the first Buccaneer guards with the speed to lead running plays. The team tried to address their lack of experience at linebacker by arranging a trade for Jack 'Hacksaw' Reynolds, at the time a training camp holdout from the Los Angeles Rams. Reynolds questioned the validity of his contract, and refused to report to what his agent called "Outer Mongolia". The Buccaneers eventually negated the trade, and obtained Rik Bonness from the Raiders. Bonness, a former Nebraska center in only his second season as a linebacker, added depth but not experience. Former 1974 first-round draft choice Bill Kollar came to Tampa Bay after being let go by the Cincinnati Bengals due to injury concerns. Jeris White came over from the Miami Dolphins to solidify the trouble spot at left cornerback.

== Regular season ==
The Buccaneers took their place in the NFC Central division, while the other 1976 expansion team, the Seattle Seahawks, switched conferences with Tampa Bay and joined the AFC West. This fulfilled the NFL's plan of having the expansion teams play each other twice and every other NFL franchise once during their first two seasons. Tampa Bay's 1977 schedule consisted of a game against each of the other 13 NFC teams, and the Seahawks.

Coach John McKay declared the team to be "stronger at every position, with the exception of the quarterback position" than the 1976 team. The improved Buccaneer lineup included such oddities as running back Anthony Davis, who entered the NFL after playing in the World Football League and the Canadian Football League and thus was a rookie for the third time, and Cecil Johnson, a free-agent linebacker from Miami who chose the Buccaneers over three other teams so that he "wouldn't have a long, sad ride home" if he didn't make the squad. Progress was apparent with the defense, who allowed no 100-yard rushing performances other than Walter Payton's. A wave of injuries to the offense forced constant lineup changes. Redskins defensive end Ron McDole observed that, while the offensive line featured good individual blockers, their lack of experience playing together hindered their ability to operate as a unit, and that they were easily beaten by pulling stunts. Defenders thus had little trouble thwarting the "Student Body Right" plays favored by McKay. Never able to establish any offensive consistency, they were shut out an NFL-record six times (a league record that still stands) and managed only six touchdowns in the entire season. Their first twelve games produced a mere 53 points, of which 23 occurred against fellow expansion team Seattle, and seven from a fumble return touchdown against Dallas. McKay illustrated the team's situation with comments such as "We couldn't score against a strong wind", and "I may quarterback the team myself." Quarterback was the position most obviously affected, but the tight end position was struck similarly. A season-ending knee injury suffered by tight end Bob Moore in one game left Dana Nafziger, an injured rookie whose regular position was linebacker, as the team's only player available at a position that was crucial to McKay's offense. Ricky Bell had some injuries to contend with, but when healthy, displayed sluggish play and a tendency to fumble on crucial drives. Injuries, especially at quarterback and offensive line, prevented the offense from gaining any consistency, while the inexperienced line was able to provide neither adequate pass protection nor lanes for the running backs. Opponents lauded the Buccaneer defense's performance and stated that the team needed to improve its offense; they posted a record numbers of sacks against the Tampa Bay offense.

=== 0–26 losing streak ends ===
Q. Name two disasters that were accompanied by band music...

A. The RMS Titanic and the Tampa Bay Buccaneers.

– Johnny Carson

The Buccaneers' losing streak was so famous that Johnny Carson frequently mocked the team on The Tonight Show. McKay joked that to break the jinx he had tried sleeping on his left and right sides, had worn many different outfits during games, and might try coaching naked. Fearful of the perceived humiliation of being the first to lose to Tampa Bay, opponents prepared carefully for the Buccaneers. Dallas Cowboys quarterback Roger Staubach said, "...we didn't want to be the first. Psychologically, it could have wrecked our year." New York Giants coach John McVay said after a victory, "In 25 years of coaching I've never had as much pressure on me as I did this week". A popular Tampa area T-shirt depicted a sinking pirate ship with the inscription "Go for 0". The franchise finally broke through to victory in a week 13 road game against the New Orleans Saints that led Saints head coach Hank Stram to lament, "What a nightmare. It was the worst experience of my coaching career. We're all ashamed for our people, for our fans, for our organization." Stram, an early head-coaching candidate for the expansion Buccaneers, was fired the following week and never coached again. The first Buccaneer home victory came in the following week's season-ending game against the St. Louis Cardinals. Cardinals coach Don Coryell, already feuding with team owner Bill Bidwill, was also fired shortly after the loss. The two-game winning streak ended the Buccaneers' losing streak at 0–26. Saints safety Tom Myers said "We've been made the laughingstocks of the business ... I'm too embarrassed to say that I play for the team that got beat by Tampa Bay." He, Stram, and others described the game as a Saints loss, not a Buccaneers win; Stram insisted that his team was better overall.

"It was the greatest victory in the history of the world. This is a habit I could get accustomed to", McKay joked through a megaphone, standing on top of a parked car, to a crowd of 8,000 celebrating fans around team headquarters. They gathered to greet the team two hours before the team plane arrived from New Orleans; the crowd caused police to close the street. Howard Cosell honored the Buccaneers’ first victory by choosing it as the lead game for the halftime highlights of ABC TV's Monday Night Football broadcast, and interviewed McKay by telephone during the game. Bill Cosby, guest hosting for Carson on Tonight, performed a five-minute comedy routine on the win. Audiences in NFL stadiums around the country cheered when they heard of the victory; dozens of people, including NFL Commissioner Pete Rozelle and McVay, sent telegrams or called to congratulate the team and McKay. Comedian George Burns, playing God in Oh, God!, took credit for what his telegram described as a miracle more difficult than the parting of the Red Sea or the 1969 Mets.

Both the St. Petersburg Times and Tampa Tribune's "BUCS WIN" headlines used gigantic, wartime-suitable font sizes; local radio stations spent hours discussing only the victory; one TV station did a live special report; and two other stations broadcast 30-minute specials the day after. Fans rushed to buy tickets for the last game of the season, increasing projected attendance by 50% and forcing the ticket office to stay open late. Tampa television had never shown Buccaneers home games because of NFL blackout rules; when discussing the possibility that the next game might sell out and be broadcast, owner Hugh Culverhouse admitted that he had never expected the team to do so. No Buccaneers were honored with Pro Bowl selections following the season, although it was believed that Lee Roy Selmon, Dave Lewis, and Dave Pear would all have been chosen had they played on a playoff contender.

=== Schedule ===
| Week | Date | Opponent | Result | Record | Venue | Attendance |
|---|---|---|---|---|---|---|
| 1 | September 18 | at Philadelphia Eagles | **L** 3–13 | 0–1 | Veterans Stadium | 63,132 |
| 2 | September 24 | **Minnesota Vikings** | **L** 3–9 | 0–2 | Tampa Stadium | 66,272 |
| 3 | October 2 | at Dallas Cowboys | **L** 7–23 | 0–3 | Texas Stadium | 55,316 |
| 4 | October 9 | Washington Redskins | **L** 0–10 | 0–4 | Tampa Stadium | 58,571 |
| 5 | October 16 | at Seattle Seahawks | **L** 23–30 | 0–5 | Kingdome | 54,783 |
| 6 | October 23 | **Green Bay Packers** | **L** 0–13 | 0–6 | Tampa Stadium | 47,635 |
| 7 | October 30 | at San Francisco 49ers | **L** 10–20 | 0–7 | Candlestick Park | 34,700 |
| 8 | November 6 | at Los Angeles Rams | **L** 0–31 | 0–8 | Los Angeles Memorial Coliseum | 45,493 |
| 9 | November 13 | New York Giants | **L** 0–10 | 0–9 | Tampa Stadium | 46,518 |
| 10 | November 20 | at **Detroit Lions** | **L** 7–16 | 0–10 | Pontiac Silverdome | 49,751 |
| 11 | November 27 | Atlanta Falcons | **L** 0–17 | 0–11 | Tampa Stadium | 43,592 |
| 12 | December 4 | **Chicago Bears** | **L** 0–10 | 0–12 | Tampa Stadium | 48,948 |
| 13 | December 11 | at New Orleans Saints | **W** 33–14 | 1–12 | Louisiana Superdome | 40,124 |
| 14 | December 18 | St. Louis Cardinals | **W** 17–7 | 2–12 | Tampa Stadium | 56,922 |
Note: Intra-division opponents are in **bold** text.

Notes:

^{a} All times in North American Eastern Time. (UTC–4 and UTC–5 during Standard Time)

=== Standings ===
NFC Central
| | W | L | T | PCT | DIV | CONF | PF | PA | STK |
|---|---|---|---|---|---|---|---|---|---|
| ^{(3)} Minnesota Vikings | 9 | 5 | 0 | .643 | 6–1 | 8–4 | 231 | 227 | W1 |
| ^{(4)} Chicago Bears | 9 | 5 | 0 | .643 | 6–1 | 8–4 | 255 | 253 | W6 |
| Detroit Lions | 6 | 8 | 0 | .429 | 2–5 | 4–8 | 183 | 252 | L1 |
| Green Bay Packers | 4 | 10 | 0 | .286 | 2–5 | 4–7 | 134 | 219 | W1 |
| Tampa Bay Buccaneers | 2 | 12 | 0 | .143 | 0–4 | 2–11 | 103 | 223 | W2 |

== Personnel ==
Tampa Bay Buccaneers 1977 roster
| Quarterbacks: 17 Jeb Blount*; 14 Randy Hedberg*; 19 Gary Huff*; Running backs: 42 Ricky Bell*; 32 Louis Carter*; 35 Jimmy DuBose*; 30 Walter Packer; 23 George Ragsdale; 43 Ed Williams*; Wide receivers: 81 Isaac Hagins*; 89 J. K. McKay*; 87 Larry Mucker; 85 Morris Owens*; Tight ends: 84 Lon Boyett; 83 Dana Nafziger*; 80 Jack Novak*; 82 Charles Waddell | Offensive linemen: 70 Darryl Carlton* RT; 66 Blanchard Carter T; 65 Randy Johnson G; 68 Dan Medlin* RG; 75 Dave Reavis* LT; 51 Dan Ryczek* C; 79 Steve Wilson* C/G; 62 Jeff Winans* LG; Defensive linemen: 72 Greg Johnson DE; 77 Bill Kollar NT; 76 Dave Pear* NT; 64 Glenn Robinson DE; 78 Council Rudolph* LDE; 63 Lee Roy Selmon* RDE | Linebackers: 53 Rik Bonness OLB; 52 Paul Harris OLB; 56 Cecil Johnson* ROLB; 59 Mike Lemon ILB; 57 David Lewis* LOLB; 61 Dewey Selmon* LILB; 54 Richard Wood* RILB; Defensive backs: 34 Cedric Brown* FS; 33 Mark Cotney* SS; 25 Curtis Jordan* SS; 46 Danny Reece CB; 40 Mike Washington* RCB; 45 Jeris White* LCB; Special teams: 4 Dave Green P/K | Reserve lists: 10 Mike Boryla QB (IR); 26 Charlie Davis RB (IR); 72 Howard Fest G/T (IR); 73 Charley Hannah DE (IR); -- Calvin Harper T (IR); 9 Allan Leavitt K (IR); 86 Bob Moore TE (IR); 58 Cal Peterson LB (IR); rookies in italics * = starters |

=== Coaching staff ===
Tampa Bay Buccaneers 1977 coaching staff
| Front office: Owner – Hugh Culverhouse; General manager – John McKay; Head coaches: Head coach – John McKay; Offensive coaches: Quarterbacks and receivers – Bill Nelsen; Running backs – Willie Brown; Offensive line – Jerry Frei; Offensive line – Skip Husbands | Defensive coaches: Chief assistant/defensive line – Abe Gibron; Linebackers – Tom Bass; Linebackers – Phil Krueger; Defensive backs – Wayne Fontes |

== Game summaries ==
=== Week 1: at Philadelphia Eagles ===
Week One: Tampa Bay Buccaneers at Philadelphia Eagles – Game summary

| Quarter | 1 | 2 | 3 | 4 | Total |
|---|---|---|---|---|---|
| Buccaneers | 0 | 0 | 3 | 0 | 3 |
| Eagles | 0 | 7 | 6 | 0 | 13 |

at Veterans Stadium, Philadelphia, Pennsylvania

- Date: September 18
- Game time: 1:00 p.m. EDT
- Game weather: 74 °F (23.3 °C)
- Game attendance: 63,132
- Referee: Red Cashion
- TV announcers (CBS): Frank Glieber and Johnny Unitas

Game information

First quarter

- No scoring plays

Second quarter

- PHI – Tom Sullivan 7-yard pass from Ron Jaworski (Horst Muhlmann kick). Eagles 7–0.

Third quarter

- TB – Dave Green 22-yard field goal. Eagles 7–3.
- PHI – Keith Krepfle 17-yard pass from Ron Jaworski (kick failed). Eagles 13–3.

Fourth quarter

- No scoring plays

Top passers

- TB – Randy Hedberg – 10/25, 66 yards
- PHI – Ron Jaworski – 14/24, 147 yards, 2 TD, 2 INT

Top rushers

- TB – Ricky Bell – 15 rushes, 53 yards
- PHI – Tom Sullivan – 20 rushes, 56 yards

Top receivers

- TB – Morris Owens – 2 receptions, 21 yards
- PHI – Keith Krepfle – 4 receptions, 77 yards, TD

Philadelphia Eagles’ tight end Keith Krepfle, playing in a cast with pins in his hand, caught a 17-yard touchdown pass from Ron Jaworski and made a 28-yard reception that set up a second touchdown. Ricky Bell carried the ball 15 times for 53 yards for the Buccaneers, but killed a scoring drive by fumbling on the Eagles’ 9-yard line. At quarterback, the Bucs started rookie Randy Hedberg, who had been the 196th overall pick in the draft; since then, no team has opened a season with a starting rookie quarterback drafted lower than Hedberg. With Hedberg unable to pick up the Eagles’ blitzes, the Buccaneers were ineffective on offense. After having praised the offensive line's performance in their final preseason game against the Baltimore Colts, coach McKay complained that the line "refused to block", and called the team's performance "horse manure". The offense failed to convert four opportunities from deep within Eagles territory, and scored only on a 22-yard Dave Green field goal.

=== Week 2: vs Minnesota Vikings ===
Week Two: Minnesota Vikings at Tampa Bay Buccaneers – Game summary

| Quarter | 1 | 2 | 3 | 4 | Total |
|---|---|---|---|---|---|
| Vikings | 0 | 2 | 7 | 0 | 9 |
| Buccaneers | 0 | 3 | 0 | 0 | 3 |

at Tampa Stadium, Tampa, Florida

- Date: September 24
- Game time: 8:00 p.m. EDT
- Game weather: 80 °F (26.7 °C)
- Game attendance: 66,272
- Referee: Fred Wyant

Game information

First quarter

- No scoring plays

Second quarter

- MIN – Randy Hedberg sacked in end zone by Carl Eller for a safety. Vikings 2–0.
- TB – Allan Leavitt 18-yard field goal. Buccaneers 3–2.

Third quarter

- MIN – Chuck Foreman 31-yard pass from Fran Tarkenton (Fred Cox kick). Vikings 9–3.

Fourth quarter

- No scoring plays

Top passers

- MIN – Fran Tarkenton – 25/38, 223 yards, TD, 2 INT
- TB – Randy Hedberg – 4/14, 51 yards, 3 INT

Top rushers

- MIN – Chuck Foreman 14 rushes, 58 yards
- TB – Ricky Bell – 21 rushes, 66 yards

Top receivers

- MIN – Chuck Foreman – 4 receptions, 52 yards, TD
- TB – Morris Owens – 2 receptions, 26 yards

A scrambling, improvised 31-yard touchdown pass from Fran Tarkenton to Chuck Foreman on a broken play allowed the Minnesota Vikings to come from behind for the win. Carl Eller sacked Randy Hedberg in the end zone to give the Vikings an early lead, but the Buccaneers answered with an 18-yard Allan Leavitt field goal. Several key penalties and mental errors hurt the Buccaneers’ prospects of winning. An attempted quarterback sneak from the Vikings’ 1-yard line failed when a tailback forgot to line up, leaving the team with only ten players on the field. Dan Ryczek's clipping penalty took the Buccaneers out of field position and provided the Vikings with a short field for their scoring drive, while Eller's safety was set up when Bill Kollar's late hit on a punt play gave Tampa Bay possession inside their own 10-yard line. The safety destroyed Hedberg's confidence, and he was replaced by Gary Huff after completing only 4 of 14 passes for 51 yards. Unwilling to give any credit to the Buccaneer defense, the Vikings blamed their poor offensive performance on the wet field. This angered McKay, who thought that the Buccaneers should have been given more credit for a near-upset of a perennial Super Bowl contender. McKay also chafed over Minnesota comments that the Buccaneer offense was predictable and conservative, and accused the Vikings of the same. Tarkenton completed 25 of 38 passes for 223 yards, but was intercepted once by Dewey Selmon, and his completions were mostly limited to dump-offs to his running backs. Dave Lewis injured his knee early in the game, and newly acquired ex-Steelers linebacker Paul Harris played well in his place. Ricky Bell's 21 carries were the most yet by a Buccaneer running back, and the Vikings’ 9 points were the least yet allowed by the Buccaneers. The crowd of 66,272 was the second-largest attendance to date in Tampa Stadium.

=== Week 3: at Dallas Cowboys ===
Week Three: Tampa Bay Buccaneers at Dallas Cowboys – Game summary

| Quarter | 1 | 2 | 3 | 4 | Total |
|---|---|---|---|---|---|
| Buccaneers | 0 | 7 | 0 | 0 | 7 |
| Cowboys | 17 | 3 | 3 | 0 | 23 |

at Texas Stadium, Irving, Texas

- Date: October 2
- Game time: 1:00 p.m. EDT / 12:00 p.m. CDT
- Game weather: 74 °F (23.3 °C)
- Game attendance: 55,316
- Referee: Bernie Ulman
- TV announcers (CBS): Frank Glieber and Alex Hawkins

Game information

First quarter

- DAL – Efrén Herrera 32-yard field goal. Cowboys 3–0.
- DAL – Thomas Henderson 79-yard interception return (Efrén Herrera kick). Cowboys 10–0.
- DAL – Robert Newhouse 17-yard run (Efrén Herrera kick). Cowboys 17–0.

Second quarter

- TB – Richard Wood 37-yard fumble return (Allan Leavitt kick). Cowboys 17–7.
- DAL – Efrén Herrera 19-yard field goal. Cowboys 20–7.

Third quarter

- DAL – Efrén Herrera 20-yard field goal. Cowboys 23–7.

Fourth quarter

- No scoring plays

Top passers

- TB – Gary Huff – 8/23, 107 yards, 2 INT
- DAL – Roger Staubach – 15/24, 212 yards, INT

Top rushers

- TB – Anthony Davis – 15 rushes, 30 yards
- DAL – Robert Newhouse – 16 rushes, 73 yards, TD

Top receivers

- TB – Morris Owens – 4 receptions, 57 yards
- DAL – Preston Pearson – 5 receptions, 65 yards

Gary Huff and Anthony Davis returned from injuries to make their first starts for the team. The Buccaneers’ projected running back tandem of Davis at halfback and Ricky Bell at fullback finally materialized, although this would be its only appearance before McKay settled on Bell and Jimmy DuBose as his starters. The Buccaneers were not displeased with Randy Hedberg's performance at quarterback over the first two games, but Huff's experience was welcomed against a confusing Dallas defense. While the offense was again held scoreless, Richard Wood returned a Tony Dorsett fumble 37 yards for the Buccaneers’ first touchdown of the season, and then mocked Cowboy Thomas "Hollywood" Henderson's earlier interception celebration by spiking the ball over the goalposts. Wood returned a second interception 29 yards. Several Cowboys complained of excessive trash-talking from the Buccaneers, and Cecil Johnson in particular. Johnson, who roomed with Dorsett in college and claimed close friendship with him, tore Dorsett's helmet off and punched him in the nose on consecutive plays. Numerous costly injuries occurred: a season-ending knee injury to Bob Moore meant that the team's only remaining tight end was Dana Nafziger, who also suffered injuries to his knee and wrist. Ricky Bell and Jimmy DuBose both went out early. Gary Huff played the game in a knee brace, while starters Jeff Winans, Dave Lewis, and Jack Novak did not play at all.

=== Week 4: vs Washington Redskins ===
Week Four: Washington Redskins at Tampa Bay Buccaneers – Game summary

| Quarter | 1 | 2 | 3 | 4 | Total |
|---|---|---|---|---|---|
| Redskins | 10 | 0 | 0 | 0 | 10 |
| Buccaneers | 0 | 0 | 0 | 0 | 0 |

at Tampa Stadium, Tampa, Florida

- Date: October 9
- Game time: 4:00 p.m. EDT
- Game weather: 77 °F (25 °C)
- Game attendance: 58,571
- Referee: Cal Lepore

Game information

First quarter

- WAS – Mark Moseley 44-yard field goal. Redskins 3–0.
- WAS – Mike Thomas 6-yard run (Mark Moseley kick). Redskins 10–0.

Second quarter

- No scoring plays

Third quarter

- No scoring plays

Fourth quarter

- No scoring plays

Top passers

- WAS – Billy Kilmer – 11/22, 134 yards, INT
- TB – Gary Huff – 10/26, 138 yards, 3 INT

Top rushers

- WAS – John Riggins – 17 rushes, 52 yards
- TB – Anthony Davis – 15 rushes, 54 yards

Top receivers

- WAS – Jean Fugett – 3 receptions, 48 yards
- TB – Larry Mucker – 3 receptions, 42 yards

Ricky Bell sat out the game with a shoulder injury, and Darryl Carlton left the game early. Tampa Bay quarterbacks were sacked ten times (still a team record as of 2009), and threw three interceptions. Eddie Brown's 11 punt returns set an NFL single-game record, also still standing. John McKay reacted angrily to Washington tackle Bill Brundige's postgame remarks that McKay's USC offense would not work in the NFL. McKay called Brundige an "idiot" and a "dumb tackle", and pointed out that the Redskins scored their first touchdown from the same formation. He then told reporters, "none of you know anything about football", and chided them for asking why the Buccaneers were having trouble moving the ball, when they knew that several starters were out with injuries. The Tampa Bay defense held Washington to ten points, despite the Redskins’ eight possessions in Buccaneer territory. Washington players described it as among the best in the league, and coach George Allen said it was "of championship caliber". The 18th consecutive loss tied the Buccaneers with the 1972–1973 Houston Oilers for the third longest NFL losing streak.

=== Week 5: at Seattle Seahawks ===
Week Five: Tampa Bay Buccaneers at Seattle Seahawks – Game summary

| Quarter | 1 | 2 | 3 | 4 | Total |
|---|---|---|---|---|---|
| Buccaneers | 6 | 7 | 3 | 7 | 23 |
| Seahawks | 7 | 10 | 0 | 13 | 30 |

at Kingdome, Seattle, Washington

- Date: October 16
- Game time: 4:00 p.m. EDT / 1:00 p.m. PDT
- Game weather: None (played indoors)
- Game attendance: 54,783
- Referee: Fred Silva
- TV announcers (CBS): Jim Thacker and Johnny Unitas

Game information

First quarter

- SEA – Steve Largent 8-yard pass from Steve Myer (John Leypoldt kick). Seahawks 7–0.
- TB – Allan Leavitt 40-yard field goal. Seahawks 7–3.
- TB – Allan Leavitt 37-yard field goal. Seahawks 7–6.

Second quarter

- SEA – Steve Largent 4-yard pass from Steve Myer (John Leypoldt kick). Seahawks 14–6.
- TB – Anthony Davis 1-yard run (Allan Leavitt kick). Seahawks 14–13.
- SEA – John Leypoldt 43-yard field goal. Seahawks 17–13.

Third quarter

- TB – Allan Leavitt 20-yard field goal. Seahawks 17–16.

Fourth quarter

- SEA – Duke Fergerson 45-yard pass from Steve Myer (John Lepoldt kick). Seahawks 24–16.
- TB – Morris Owens 67-yard pass from Gary Huff (Allan Leavitt kick). Seahawks 24–23.
- SEA – Sherman Smith 44-yard pass from Steve Myer (kick failed). Seahawks 30–23.

Top passers

- TB – Gary Huff – 18/32, 217 yards, TD, 4 INT
- SEA – Steve Myer – 20/30, 252 yards, 4 TD, 2 INT

Top rushers

- TB – Anthony Davis – 14 rushes, 83 yards, TD
- SEA – Sherman Smith – 19 rushes, 94 yards

Top receivers

- TB – Morris Owens – 9 receptions, 166 yards, TD
- SEA – Duke Fergerson – 3 receptions, 65 yards, TD

McKay's pregame concern over his team's pass defense proved prophetic, as Seattle Seahawks backup quarterback Steve Myer passed for four touchdowns. Myer replaced an injured Jim Zorn, and threw two touchdowns to Steve Largent, one to Duke Fergerson, and one to Sherman Smith. The Seahawks still needed two late interceptions to seal the victory, as the Buccaneers’ offense achieved their highest point total to date. Gary Huff completed 18 of 32 pass attempts for 217 yards, but was intercepted four times. His audible to beat a Seattle blitz resulted in a 67-yard touchdown pass to Morris Owens, and Anthony Davis had a 1-yard touchdown run. Owens gained 166 yards, a Buccaneers single-game record that stood for four years. Allan Leavitt contributed three field goals. McKay blamed the defensive letdown to the team's tendency to stop playing pass coverage when the quarterback would roll out, and said that they tackled "like a bunch of guys from a junior high school team".

=== Week 6: vs Green Bay Packers ===
Week Six: Green Bay Packers at Tampa Bay Buccaneers – Game summary

| Quarter | 1 | 2 | 3 | 4 | Total |
|---|---|---|---|---|---|
| Packers | 0 | 6 | 7 | 0 | 13 |
| Buccaneers | 0 | 0 | 0 | 0 | 0 |

at Tampa Stadium, Tampa, Florida

- Date: October 23
- Game time: 1:00 p.m. EDT
- Game weather: 73 °F (22.8 °C)
- Game attendance: 47,635
- Referee: Dick Jorgensen

Game information

First quarter

- No scoring plays

Second quarter

- GB – Chester Marcol 40-yard field goal. Packers 3–0.
- GB – Chester Marcol 44-yard field goal. Packers 6–0.

Third quarter

- GB – Eric Torkelson 5-yard run (Chester Marcol kick). Packers 13–0.

Fourth quarter

- No scoring plays

Top passers

- GB – Lynn Dickey – 11/15, 115 yards, INT
- TB – Gary Huff – 12/22, 125 yards

Top rushers

- GB – Eric Torkelson – 22 rushes, 73 yards, TD
- TB – Ricky Bell – 10 rushes, 32 yards

Top receivers

- GB – Barty Smith – 1 reception, 42 yards
- TB – Dana Nafziger – 4 receptions, 62 yards

The Green Bay Packers recovered reserve linebacker Jim Gueno's block of a Dave Green punt at the Buccaneers’ 24-yard line, which set up the only touchdown of the day and sealed a Packers victory. It was the first time since November 24, 1974, that the Packers had recorded a shutout. Tampa Bay drives ended in penalties and turnovers, and the Buccaneers once drove all the way to the Packers’ 2-yard line before a Ricky Bell fumble ended their opportunity. Chester Marcol kicked two field goals, and Eric Torkelson rushed 22 times for 73 yards and the touchdown. Gary Huff completed 12 of 22 passes before he was pulled in the fourth quarter. Fans cheered when a sack laid Huff motionless on the turf with a cracked rib. Offensive line play continued to be criticized, as both Buccaneer quarterbacks suffered injuries. Randy Hedberg replaced Huff, and played the final series with a concussion. He had to be led off of the field to be hospitalized after the game. Both injuries were due to hits by Mike Butler. Packers quarterback Lynn Dickey was sacked three times, and knocked out of the game. The Packers and Buccaneers entered the game with the league's 26th- and 28th-ranked offenses, respectively.

=== Week 7: at San Francisco 49ers ===
Week Seven: Tampa Bay Buccaneers at San Francisco 49ers – Game summary

| Quarter | 1 | 2 | 3 | 4 | Total |
|---|---|---|---|---|---|
| Buccaneers | 0 | 0 | 3 | 7 | 10 |
| 49ers | 7 | 7 | 6 | 0 | 20 |

at Candlestick Park, San Francisco, California

- Date: October 30
- Game time: 4:00 p.m. EDT / 1:00 p.m. PDT
- Game weather: 59 °F (15 °C)
- Game attendance: 34,700
- Referee: Jim Tunney

Game information

First quarter

- SF – Wilbur Jackson 2-yard run (Ray Wersching kick). 49ers 7–0.

Second quarter

- SF – Delvin Williams 35-yard run (Ray Wersching kick). 49ers 14–0.

Third quarter

- TB – Allan Leavitt 29-yard field goal. 49ers 14–3.
- SF – Ray Wersching 31-yard field goal. 49ers 17–3.
- SF – Ray Wersching 43-yard field goal. 49ers 20–3.

Fourth quarter

- TB – Louis Carter 5-yard run (Allan Leavitt kick). 49ers 20–10.

Top passers

- TB – Jeb Blount – 11/29, 145 yards, INT
- SF – Jim Plunkett – 12/20, 120 yards, INT

Top rushers

- TB – Ricky Bell – 15 rushes, 28 yards
- SF – Delvin Williams – 21 rushes, 94 yards, TD

Top receivers

- TB – Danny Reece – 1 reception, 45 yards
- SF – Tom Mitchell – 6 receptions, 61 yards

Jeb Blount inspired teammates with a courageous performance in the face of a strong San Francisco pass rush, despite that he was named the starter only two days previously. Wilbur Jackson and Delvin Williams each ran for a touchdown, and Ray Wersching kicked a pair of field goals to give the San Francisco 49ers a lead that the Buccaneers would not overcome. The Buccaneers rallied in the fourth quarter. Blount led a drive that ended with a 5-yard Louis Carter touchdown run, and was followed by an onside kick which the Buccaneers recovered. Dave Green threw a 45-yard completion to Danny Reece on a fake punt, but the offense stalled at San Francisco's 1-yard line.

=== Week 8: at Los Angeles Rams ===
Week Eight: Tampa Bay Buccaneers at Los Angeles Rams – Game summary

| Quarter | 1 | 2 | 3 | 4 | Total |
|---|---|---|---|---|---|
| Buccaneers | 0 | 0 | 0 | 0 | 0 |
| Rams | 3 | 14 | 7 | 7 | 31 |

at Los Angeles Memorial Coliseum, Los Angeles, California

- Date: November 6
- Game time: 4:00 p.m. EST / 1:00 p.m. PST
- Game weather: 62 °F (16.7 °C)
- Game attendance: 45,493
- Referee: Gordon McCarter
- TV announcers (CBS): Bob Costas and Sonny Jurgensen

Game information

First quarter

- LA – Rafael Septien 31-yard field goal. Rams 3–0.

Second quarter

- LA – Harold Jackson 51-yard pass from Pat Haden (Rafael Septien kick). Rams 10–0.
- LA – Lawrence McCutcheon 4-yard pass from Pat Haden (Rafael Septien kick). Rams 17–0.

Third quarter

- LA – Jim Young 25-yard interception return (Rafael Septien kick). Rams 24–0.

Fourth quarter

- LA – Jim Jodat 1-yard run (Rafael Septien kick). Rams 31–0.

Top passers

- TB – Jeb Blount – 8/21, 83 yards, 2 INT
- LA – Pat Haden – 10/21, 123 yards, 2 TD

Top rushers

- TB – Jimmy DuBose – 7 rushes, 39 yards
- LA – Lawrence McCutcheon – 23 rushes, 79 yards

Top receivers

- TB – Anthony Davis – 1 reception, 29 yards
- LA – Harold Jackson – 3 receptions, 67 yards, TD

Rams quarterback Pat Haden was 10 of 21 for 123 yards passing, and two touchdowns. Jeb Blount was 8 of 21 for 83 yards for the Buccaneers, with two interceptions. On one play the Rams jumped offside, but the penalty was called against the Buccaneers. The officials corrected their mistake, but angered McKay by laughing about it. The Rams lost Dennis Harrah for the season with a knee injury, and suffered injuries to Dave Elmendorf and Kevin McLain.

=== Week 9: vs New York Giants ===
Week Nine: New York Giants at Tampa Bay Buccaneers – Game summary

| Quarter | 1 | 2 | 3 | 4 | Total |
|---|---|---|---|---|---|
| Giants | 7 | 3 | 0 | 0 | 10 |
| Buccaneers | 0 | 0 | 0 | 0 | 0 |

at Tampa Stadium, Tampa, Florida

- Date: November 13
- Game time: 1:00 p.m. EST
- Game weather: 53 °F (11.7 °C)
- Game attendance: 46,518
- Referee: Jerry Markbreit

Game information

First quarter

- NYG – Bobby Hammond 2-yard run (Joe Danelo kick). Giants 7–0.

Second quarter

- NYG – Joe Danelo 43-yard field goal. Giants 10–0.

Third quarter

- No scoring plays

Fourth quarter

- No scoring plays

Top passers

- NYG – Joe Pisarcik – 6/12, 88 yards, INT
- TB – Jeb Blount – 13/26, 234 yards, 3 INT

Top rushers

- NYG – Bobby Hammond – 20 rushes, 55 yards, TD
- TB – Rickey Bell – 16 rushes, 42 yards

Top receivers

- NYG – Gary Shirk – 4 receptions, 61 yards
- TB – Morris Owens – 5 receptions, 113 yards

Despite nine possessions inside the New York Giants’ 35-yard line and six inside the 12, the Buccaneers were held scoreless for the fourth time of the season. It was the Giants’ first shutout since 1970. Dan Ryczek's high snap to punter Dave Green resulted in the Giants taking possession at the Buccaneers’ 1-yard line, leading to a Bob Hammond run for the Giants’ only touchdown. The Buccaneers were stopped twice when choosing to run on fourth down instead of attempting field goals. Isaac Hagins narrowly missed returning the kickoff for a touchdown following the Giants’ touchdown, but was tackled by the kicker. Danny Reece also was tackled by the last Giant during a punt return that nearly went for a touchdown. Starting quarterback Jeb Blount passed for 234 yards, and threw a touchdown pass to Louis Carter that was called back.

=== Week 10: at Detroit Lions ===
Week Ten: Tampa Bay Buccaneers at Detroit Lions – Game summary

| Quarter | 1 | 2 | 3 | 4 | Total |
|---|---|---|---|---|---|
| Buccaneers | 0 | 7 | 0 | 0 | 7 |
| Lions | 0 | 0 | 3 | 13 | 16 |

at Pontiac Silverdome, Pontiac, Michigan

- Date: November 20
- Game time: 2:00 p.m. EST
- Game weather: None (played indoors)
- Game attendance: 49,751
- Referee: Cal Lepore

Game information

First quarter

- No scoring plays

Second quarter

- TB – Rickey Bell 4-yard run (Allan Leavitt kick). Buccaneers 7–0.

Third quarter

- DET – Steve Mike-Mayer 47-yard field goal. Buccaneers 7–3.

Fourth quarter

- DET – Rick Kane 1-yard run (kick failed). Lions 9–7.
- DET – Reggie Pinkney 48-yard interception return (Steve Mike-Mayer kick). Lions 16–7.

Top passers

- TB – Jeb Blount – 4/12, 56 yards, INT
- DET – Gary Danielson – 7/17, 80 yards, INT

Top rushers

- TB – Rickey Bell – 16 rushes, 59 yards, TD
- DET – Rick Kane – 18 rushes, 57 yards, TD

Top receivers

- TB – Isaac Hagins – 2 receptions, 57 yards
- DET – J. D. Hill – 3 receptions, 32 yards

Detroit Lions’ quarterback Joe Reed prevented two Buccaneer touchdowns by tackling Dave Pear on a fumble return and Mike Washington on an interception return. Dan Ryczek's high snap ruined what was potentially a game-winning field goal attempt. Detroit fans booed the home team throughout the first half, and cheered when Ricky Bell scored on a 4-yard touchdown run following Washington's interception. This was the first time all year that the Buccaneers were the team to score first in a game. Fan support turned when Gary Danielson replaced Reed in the second half. After Dick Jauron intercepted a Jeb Blount pass, Danielson led a 55-yard drive that ended in a 1-yard touchdown run by Rick Kane. A potential touchdown pass bounced off of Isaac Hagins’ helmet at the Detroit 10-yard line, and another was fumbled by Hagins and recovered in the end zone by James Hunter. Reggie Pinkney's late touchdown return of a Randy Hedberg interception sealed the victory for the Lions.

=== Week 11: vs Atlanta Falcons ===
Week Eleven: Atlanta Falcons at Tampa Bay Buccaneers – Game summary

| Quarter | 1 | 2 | 3 | 4 | Total |
|---|---|---|---|---|---|
| Falcons | 10 | 0 | 7 | 0 | 17 |
| Buccaneers | 0 | 0 | 0 | 0 | 0 |

at Tampa Stadium, Tampa, Florida

- Date: November 27
- Game time: 1:00 p.m. EST
- Game weather: 53 °F (11.7 °C)
- Game attendance: 43,592
- Referee: Bob Frederic
- TV announcers (CBS): Bob Costas and Emerson Boozer

Game information

First quarter

- ATL – Fred Steinfort 26-yard field goal. Falcons 3–0.
- ATL – Haskel Stanback 1-yard run (Fred Steinfort kick). Falcons 10–0.

Second quarter

- No scoring plays

Third quarter

- ATL – Haskel Stanback 1-yard run (Fred Steinfort kick). Falcons 17–0.

Fourth quarter

- No scoring plays

Top passers

- ATL – Steve Bartkowski – 9/14, 82 yards
- TB – Gary Huff – 4/11, 38 yards, 3 INT

Top rushers

- ATL – Haskel Stanback – 21 rushes, 75 yards, 2 TD
- TB – George Ragsdale – 2 receptions, 23 yards

Top receivers

- ATL – Jim Mitchell – 2 receptions, 32 yards
- TB – Morris Owens – 1 reception, 17 yards

The Atlanta Falcons allowed a franchise-low 78 yards of offense while holding the Buccaneers to their fifth shutout of the season. Coach McKay called the Buccaneers’ play "our worst effort in two years". Gary Huff started at quarterback, throwing three interceptions in his second return from injury of the season. This marked the Buccaneers’ twelfth change in starting quarterbacks in less than two seasons. Neither the 62 yards rushing or 16 yards passing were team lows, but the combined effort was the Buccaneers’ worst to date. The injured Ricky Bell was held to 11 yards on 6 carries. Fans threw soft drinks at McKay and son Richie, while Bell and Anthony Davis had to be restrained from going into the stands after a heckler. The Falcons intercepted the Buccaneers four times and recovered one fumble, and continued to pursue the league record for fewest points allowed in a season. They finished the game having held opponents to only 83 points, keeping them on pace to break the 1969 Minnesota Vikings record of 133.

=== Week 12: vs Chicago Bears ===
Week Twelve: Chicago Bears at Tampa Bay Buccaneers – Game summary

| Quarter | 1 | 2 | 3 | 4 | Total |
|---|---|---|---|---|---|
| Bears | 0 | 0 | 0 | 10 | 10 |
| Buccaneers | 0 | 0 | 0 | 0 | 0 |

at Tampa Stadium, Tampa, Florida

- Date: December 4
- Game time: 1:00 p.m. EST
- Game weather: 60 °F (15.6 °C)
- Game attendance: 48,948
- Referee: Dick Jorgensen

Game information

First quarter

- No scoring plays

Second quarter

- No scoring plays

Third quarter

- No scoring plays

Fourth quarter

- CHI – Robert R. Thomas 32-yard field goal. Bears 3–0.
- CHI – Walter Payton 3-yard run (Robert R. Thomas kick). Bears 10–0.

Top passers

- CHI – Bob Avellini – 11/25, 130 yards, INT
- TB – Randy Hedberg – 4/15, 36 yards, 2 INT

Top rushers

- CHI – Walter Payton – 33 rushes, 101 yards, TD
- TB – Ricky Bell – 25 rushes, 94 yards

Top receivers

- CHI – James Scott – 7 receptions, 79 yards
- TB – Isaac Hagins – 1 reception, 10 yards

Chicago Bears’ running back Walter Payton entered the game with hopes of surpassing O. J. Simpson's 2,003-yard 1973 season, but was held to 101 yards on 33 carries. Ricky Bell set new franchise rushing records with 94 yards on 25 carries. Payton scored the game's only touchdown, a three-yard run that was set up by a 32-yard pass to Steve Schubert from punter Bob Parsons. Lee Roy Selmon sacked quarterback Bob Avellini twice, blocked one of his passes, and hurried him several times. The Buccaneers’ only serious offensive threat ended with a missed field goal in the first quarter.

=== Week 13: at New Orleans Saints ===
Week Thirteen: Tampa Bay Buccaneers at New Orleans Saints – Game summary

| Quarter | 1 | 2 | 3 | 4 | Total |
|---|---|---|---|---|---|
| Buccaneers | 3 | 10 | 7 | 13 | 33 |
| Saints | 0 | 0 | 0 | 14 | 14 |

at Louisiana Superdome, New Orleans, Louisiana

- Date: December 11
- Game time: 2:00 p.m. EST / 1:00 p.m. CST
- Game weather: None (played indoors)
- Game attendance: 40,124
- Referee: Gordon McCarter

Game information

First quarter

- TB – Dave Green 40-yard field goal. Buccaneers 3–0.

Second quarter

- TB – Dave Green 25-yard field goal. Buccaneers 6–0.
- TB – Morris Owens 5-yard pass from Gary Huff (Dave Green kick). Buccaneers 13–0.

Third quarter

- TB – Mike Washington 45-yard interception return (Dave Green kick). Buccaneers 20–0.

Fourth quarter

- TB – Richard Wood 10-yard interception return (kick failed). Buccaneers 26–0.
- NO – Archie Manning 2-yard run (Rich Szaro kick). Buccaneers 26–7.
- TB – Greg Johnson fumble recovery in end zone (Dave Green kick). Buccaneers 33–7.
- NO – John Gilliam 11-yard pass from Archie Manning (Rich Szaro kick). Buccaneers 33–14.

Top passers

- TB – Gary Huff – 7/9, 96 yards, TD
- NO – Archie Manning – 13/21, 154 yards, TD, 3 INT

Top rushers

- TB – Jimmy DuBose – 17 rushes, 59 yards
- NO – Tony Galbreath – 9 rushes, 35 yards

Top receivers

- TB – Morris Owens – 2 receptions, 44 yards, TD
- NO – Don Herrmann – 4 receptions, 92 yards

Although favored by 11 points, the New Orleans Saints did not get a first down until midway through the second quarter, and did not get past midfield until nearly the end of the half. The Buccaneers began their first five drives in Saints territory, scoring on two Dave Green field goals, and a five-yard pass from Gary Huff to Morris Owens that capped off a 71-yard drive. Mike Washington made it 20–0 early in the second half, returning an interception 45 yards for a touchdown. The Buccaneers also recovered a fumble, and had six interceptions in all. Their three interception return touchdowns, with Richard Wood and Greg Johnson also scoring, tied an NFL record. Before the game, John McKay had read the team an article in which Saints’ quarterback Archie Manning stated that it would be disgraceful to lose to Tampa Bay. Inspired by the statements, the Buccaneer defense yelled, "It's disgraceful! It's disgraceful!" at him as the clock wound down. Saints coach Hank Stram was so outraged at the defeat he allegedly ordered the game film burned. The Buccaneers won their first game in franchise history in this game and officially ended a 0–26 losing streak.

=== Week 14: vs St. Louis Cardinals ===
Week Fourteen: St. Louis Cardinals at Tampa Bay Buccaneers – Game summary

| Quarter | 1 | 2 | 3 | 4 | Total |
|---|---|---|---|---|---|
| Cardinals | 0 | 7 | 0 | 0 | 7 |
| Buccaneers | 7 | 7 | 3 | 0 | 17 |

at Tampa Stadium, Tampa, Florida

- Date: December 18
- Game time: 1:00 p.m. EST
- Game weather: 66 °F (18.9 °C)
- Game attendance: 56,922
- Referee: Bernie Ulman

Game information

First quarter

- TB – Louis Carter 1-yard run (Dave Green kick). Buccaneers 7–0.

Second quarter

- TB – Morris Owens 61-yard pass from Gary Huff (Dave Green kick). Buccaneers 14–0.
- STL – Wayne Morris 3-yard run (Jim Bakken kick). Buccaneers 14–7.

Third quarter

- TB – Dave Green 23-yard field goal. Buccaneers 17–7.

Fourth quarter

- No scoring plays

Top passers

- STL – Jim Hart – 16/29, 162 yards, 2 INT
- TB – Gary Huff – 7/12, 171 yards, TD, INT

Top rushers

- STL – Wayne Morris – 19 rushes, 64 yards, TD
- TB – Jimmy DuBose – 11 rushes, 45 yards

Top receivers

- STL – Ike Harris – 6 receptions, 94 yards
- TB – Morris Owens – 4 receptions, 138 yards, TD

The Buccaneers defeated the St. Louis Cardinals, only recently eliminated from playoff contention, for their first home victory. Gary Huff completed 7 of 12 passes, including 61- and 62-yarders to Morris Owens, the first of which went for a touchdown. The improved offensive line allowed no sacks. Huff's average of 14.3 yards per pass attempt is the third-best in Buccaneer history, and stood as the record until broken by Vinny Testaverde in 1992. Said Coach McKay following the victory: "I’m going to go home, take a shower, and tell myself what a great coach I am". Fans tore down the goalposts after the game, and a vendor outside the stadium began stamping the word "Don’t" at the top of the "Throw McKay in Tampa Bay" T-shirts he had been selling. The fifty points the Bucs scored in their final two games were nearly as many (53) they had put up in the entire rest of the season (twelve games). They had scored only three points at home until this game, being shut out in five consecutive home games.

== Awards and honors ==
- Dave Pear, United Press International Second Team All-NFC
- Lee Roy Selmon, United Press International Second Team All-NFC
- Pear and Selmon were named Pro Bowl alternates

=== Records ===
- The defense's 3,926 yards allowed is the lowest in team history.
- 223 points allowed is the second-lowest in team history, although it is the third-lowest point average because of the 14-game schedule.
- 106 passing first downs allowed is a team record.
- Lee Roy Selmon's 13 sacks is fifth-best in Buccaneer history, and stood as first-place until broken by Warren Sapp (16.5) and tied by Marcus Jones, both in 2000.
- Richard Wood's 2 defensive touchdowns stood as a record until broken by Cedric Brown in 1981.
