= 1977 Green Bay Packers season =

NFL team season

- Head coach: Bart Starr
- Home stadium: Lambeau Field; Milwaukee County Stadium

Results
- Record: 4–10
- Division place: 4th NFC Central
- Playoffs: Did not qualify

The 1977 Green Bay Packers season was their 59th season overall and their 57th season in the National Football League. The team finished with a 4–10 record under coach Bart Starr, earning them a fourth-place finish in the NFC Central division. The Packers suffered injuries and continued to be among the worst teams in the NFL, posting a 4–10 record. During the season, quarterbacks Lynn Dickey and David Whitehurst combined to throw 21 interceptions while just connecting on six touchdown passes. They only scored 134 points, second worst in the league to the 2–12 Tampa Bay Buccaneers (103).

== Offseason ==
=== NFL draft ===
1977 Green Bay Packers draft
Round	Pick	Player	Position	College	Notes
1	9	Mike Butler	Defensive end	Kansas	
1	28	Ezra Johnson *	Defensive end	Morris Brown	
2	39	Greg Koch	Offensive tackle	Arkansas	
3	74	Rick Scribner	Guard	Idaho State	
5	122	Nate Simpson	Running back	Tennessee State	
6	149	Tim Moresco	Safety	Syracuse	
7	172	Derrel Gofourth	Center	Oklahoma State	
7	176	Rell Tipton	Guard	Baylor	
8	206	David Whitehurst	Quarterback	Furman	
9	233	Joel Mullins	Offensive tackle	Arkansas State	
10	260	Jim Culbreath	Running back	Oklahoma	
11	290	Terry Randolph	Cornerback	American International	
Made roster * Made at least one Pro Bowl during career

=== Undrafted free agents ===
1977 undrafted free agents of note
Player	Position	College
Rick Moore	Defensive back	North Carolina Central
Randy Rose	Wide receiver	Wisconsin

== Roster ==
1977 Green Bay Packers roster
Quarterbacks (QB): 12 Brian Dowling; 17 David Whitehurst; Running backs (RB): 31 Jim Culbreath; 40 Willard Harrell; 34 Terdell Middleton; 48 Nate Simpson; 33 Barty Smith; 26 Eric Torkelson; Wide receivers (WR): 82 Keith Hartwig; 84 Steve Odom; 89 Ollie Smith; 43 Aundra Thompson; Tight ends (TE): 88 Bert Askson; 81 Rich McGeorge	Offensive linemen (OL): 57 Derrel Gofourth C; 62 Dennis Havig G; 72 Dick Himes T; 71 Melvin Jackson G; 60 Steve Knutson G; 68 Greg Koch T; 79 Mark Koncar T; 67 Bob Kowalkowski G; 54 Larry McCarren C; Defensive linemen (DL): 70 Bob Barber DE; 77 Mike Butler DE; 90 Ezra Johnson DE; 61 Herb McMath DT; 75 Dave Pureifory DT; 74 Dave Roller DT; 83 Clarence Williams DT	Linebackers (LB): 53 Fred Carr OLB; 50 Jim Carter MLB; 51 Jim Gueno OLB; 58 Don Hansen MLB; 56 Blane Smith OLB; 59 Tom Toner OLB; Defensive backs (DB): 28 Willie Buchanon CB; 24 Johnnie Gray FS; 46 Steve Luke SS; 29 Mike McCoy CB; 37 Tim Moresco FS; 23 Terry Randolph CB; 21 Steve Wagner SS; Special teams (ST): 11 David Beverly P; 13 Chester Marcol K	Reserve: 10 Lynn Dickey QB (IR); 64 Rick Scribner T (IR); 73 Gerald Skinner T (IR); -- Rell Tipton G (IR); 18 Randy Vataha WR (IR); 52 Gary Weaver LB (IR); Rookies in italics

== Regular season ==
=== Schedule ===
Week	Date	Opponent	Result	Record	Venue	Attendance
1	September 18	at New Orleans Saints	**W** 24–20	1–0	Louisiana Superdome	56,250
2	September 25	Houston Oilers	**L** 10–16	1–1	Lambeau Field	55,071
3	October 2	at **Minnesota Vikings**	**L** 7–19	1–2	Metropolitan Stadium	47,143
4	October 9	Cincinnati Bengals	**L** 7–17	1–3	Milwaukee County Stadium	53,653
5	October 16	at **Detroit Lions**	**L** 6–10	1–4	Pontiac Silverdome	78,452
6	October 23	at **Tampa Bay Buccaneers**	**W** 13–0	2–4	Tampa Stadium	47,635
7	October 30	**Chicago Bears**	**L** 0–26	2–5	Lambeau Field	56,002
8	November 6	at Kansas City Chiefs	**L** 10–20	2–6	Arrowhead Stadium	62,687
9	November 13	Los Angeles Rams	**L** 6–24	2–7	Milwaukee County Stadium	52,948
10	November 21	at Washington Redskins	**L** 9–10	2–8	RFK Stadium	51,498
11	November 27	**Minnesota Vikings**	**L** 6–13	2–9	Lambeau Field	56,267
12	December 4	**Detroit Lions**	**W** 10–9	3–9	Lambeau Field	56,267
13	December 11	at **Chicago Bears**	**L** 10–21	3–10	Soldier Field	33,557
14	December 18	San Francisco 49ers	**W** 16–14	4–10	Milwaukee County Stadium	44,902

Monday (November 21)

Note: Intra-division opponents are in bold text.

=== Season summary ===
==== Week 1: at New Orleans Saints ====
Week 1: Green Bay Packers at New Orleans Saints

Quarter	1	2	3	4	Total
**Packers**	14	10	0	0	**24**
Saints	0	0	14	6	**20**

at Louisiana Superdome, New Orleans, Louisiana

- Date: September 18, 1977
- Game time: 12:00 p.m. CST
- Game weather: Dome
- TV announcers (CBS): Tim Ryan and Nick Buoniconti

Game information

**First quarter**

**Second quarter**

**Third quarter**

**Fourth quarter**

Top passers

- GB – Lynn Dickey – 11/20, 142 yards, TD, INT
- NO – Archie Manning – 18/30, 225 yards, TD, INT

Top rushers

- GB – Eric Torkelson – 12 rushes, 27 yards
- NO – Chuck Muncie – 20 rushes, 86 yards, 2 TD

Top receivers

- GB – Ken Payne – 3 receptions, 71 yards, TD
- NO – Henry Childs – 5 receptions, 83 yards, TD

Williard Harrell's 75-yard punt return and Lynn Dickey's 15-yard touchdown pass to Ken Payne helped Green Bay to a 24-0 that turned out to be the difference in their opener win. New Orleans' Chuck Muncie had touchdown runs of two and three yards and Archie Manning threw a 59-yard touchdown pass to Henry Childs in a futile rally. Saints coach Hank Stram said "I guess you can say we slept through the first half. You just can't play 30 minutes and expect to win."

==== Week 3: at Minnesota Vikings ====
Week 3: Green Bay Packers at Minnesota Vikings

Quarter	1	2	3	4	Total
Packers	7	0	0	0	**7**
**Vikings**	7	6	0	6	**19**

at Metropolitan Stadium, Minnesota

- Date: October 2, 1977
- Game time: 1:00 p.m. CST
- Game weather: Overcast, 47 °F (8 °C)
- TV announcers (CBS): Tim Ryan and Johnny Unitas

Game information

**First quarter**

**Second quarter**

**Third quarter**

**Fourth quarter**

Top passers

- GB – Lynn Dickey – 8/20, 143 yards, 1 TD
- MIN – Fran Tarkenton – 19/27, 184 yards, 1 TD

Top rushers

- GB – Eric Torkelson – 8 rushes, 34 yards
- MIN – Chuck Foreman – 19 rushes, 53 yards, 1 TD

Top receivers

- GB – Steve Odom – 1 receptions, 95 yards, 1 TD
- MIN – Sammy White – 5 receptions, 73 yards, 1 TD

==== Week 6: at Tampa Bay Buccaneers ====
Week Six: Green Bay Packers at Tampa Bay Buccaneers – Game summary

Quarter	1	2	3	4	Total
**Packers**	0	6	7	0	**13**
Buccaneers	0	0	0	0	**0**

at Tampa Stadium, Tampa, Florida

- Date: October 23
- Game time: 1:00 p.m. EDT
- Game weather: 73 °F (23 °C)
- Game attendance: 47,635
- Referee: Dick Jorgensen
- Box score

Game information

**First quarter**

- No scoring plays

**Second quarter**

- GB – Chester Marcol 40-yard field goal. Packers 3–0.
- GB – Chester Marcol 44-yard field goal. Packers 6–0.

**Third quarter**

- GB – Eric Torkelson 5-yard run (Chester Marcol kick). Packers 13–0.

**Fourth quarter**

- No scoring plays

**Top passers**

- GB – Lynn Dickey – 11/15, 115 yards, INT
- TB – Gary Huff – 12/22, 125 yards

**Top rushers**

- GB – Eric Torkelson – 22 rushes, 73 yards, TD
- TB – Ricky Bell – 10 rushes, 32 yards

**Top receivers**

- GB – Barty Smith – 1 reception, 42 yards
- TB – Dana Nafziger – 4 receptions, 62 yards

==== Week 7: vs Chicago Bears ====
Week 7: Chicago Bears at Green Bay Packers

Quarter	1	2	3	4	Total
**Bears**	13	3	0	10	**26**
Packers	0	0	0	0	**0**

at Lambeau Field, Green Bay, Wisconsin

- Date: October 30, 1977
- Game time: 1:00 p.m. CST
- Game weather: Overcast, 45 °F (7 °C)
- TV announcers (CBS): Gary Bender and Johnny Morris

Game information

**First quarter**

**Second quarter**

**Third quarter**

**Fourth quarter**

Top passers

- CHI – Bob Avellini – 4/9, 54 yards, TD, INT
- GB – Lynn Dickey – 10/25, 96 yards, INT

Top rushers

- CHI – Walter Payton – 23 rushes, 205 yards, 2 TDs
- GB – Barty Smith – 15 rushes, 54 yards

Top receivers

- CHI – Greg Latta – 3 receptions, 49 yards
- GB – Ollie Smith – 3 receptions, 57 yards

==== Week 8: at Kansas City Chiefs ====
Week 8: Green Bay Packers at Kansas City Chiefs – Game summary

Quarter	1	2	3	4	Total
Packers	0	0	3	7	**10**
**Chiefs**	10	0	0	10	**20**

at Arrowhead Stadium, Kansas City, Missouri

- Date: November 6
- Game time: 1:00 p.m. CST
- Game weather: Overcast, 58 °F (14 °C)
- Game attendance: 62,687
- Referee: Bob Frederic
- TV announcers (CBS): Lindsey Nelson and Paul Hornung
- Box score

Game information

**First quarter**

- KC – Jan Stenerud 27-yard field goal, 9:16. Chiefs 3–0. **Drive: 11 plays, 61 yards, 5:44.**
- KC – Henry Marshall 3-yard pass from Mike Livingston (Jan Stenerud kick), 6:23. Chiefs 10–0. **Drive: 4 plays, 39 yards, 1:19.**

**Second quarter**

- No scoring plays.

**Third quarter**

- GB – Chester Marcol 31-yard field goal, 9:11. Chiefs 10–3. **Drive: 11 plays, 49 yards, 5:49.**

**Fourth quarter**

- KC – Ed Podolak 1-yard run (Jan Stenerud kick), 14:53. Chiefs 17–3. **Drive: 7 plays, 43 yards, 2:48.**
- GB – Terdell Middleton 85-yard kickoff return (Chester Marcol kick), 14:25. Chiefs 17–10.
- KC – Jan Stenerud 22-yard field goal, 4:47. Chiefs 20–10. **Drive: 11 plays, 56 yards, 5:05.**

Top passers

- GB – Lynn Dickey – 15/28, 139 yards
- KC – Mike Livingston – 11/21, 143 yards, TD

Top rushers

- GB – Terdell Middleton – 14 rushes, 49 yards
- KC – Ed Podolak – 18 rushes, 98 yards, TD

Top receivers

- GB – Steve Odom – 6 receptions, 80 yards
- KC – Ed Podolak – 4 receptions, 51 yards

==== Week 11: vs Minnesota Vikings ====
Week 11: Minnesota Vikings at Green Bay Packers – Game summary

Quarter	1	2	3	4	Total
**Vikings**	0	13	0	0	**13**
Packers	6	0	0	0	**6**

at Lambeau Field, Green Bay, Wisconsin

- Date: Sunday, November 27
- Game time: 1:00 p.m.
- Game weather: 10 °F (−12 °C)
- Referee: Don Wedge
- TV announcers (CBS): Gary Bender and Johnny Unitas
- Pro-Football-Reference.com

Game information

**First quarter**

- GB – David Whitehurst 3-yard run (kick failed). Packers 6–0.

**Second quarter**

- MIN – Sammy White 40-yard pass from Bob Lee (Fred Cox kick). Vikings 7–6.
- MIN – Fred Cox 21-yard field goal. Vikings 10–6.
- MIN – Fred Cox 31-yard field goal. Vikings 13–6.

**Third quarter**

- No scoring plays.

**Fourth quarter**

- No scoring plays.

**Top passers**

- MIN – Bob Lee – 5/8, 68 yards, TD
- GB – David Whitehurst – 6/23, 75 yards, 2 INT

**Top rushers**

- MIN – Chuck Foreman – 26 rushes, 101 yards
- GB – Eric Torkelson – 13 rushes, 53 yards

**Top receivers**

- MIN – Sammy White – 1 reception, 40 yards, TD
- GB – Bert Askson – 1 reception, 34 yards

=== Standings ===
NFC Central
	W	L	T	PCT	DIV	CONF	PF	PA	STK
^{(3)} Minnesota Vikings	9	5	0	.643	6–1	8–4	231	227	W1
^{(4)} Chicago Bears	9	5	0	.643	6–1	8–4	255	253	W6
Detroit Lions	6	8	0	.429	2–5	4–8	183	252	L1
Green Bay Packers	4	10	0	.286	2–5	4–7	134	219	W1
Tampa Bay Buccaneers	2	12	0	.143	0–4	2–11	103	223	W2
