= Buccaneers–Saints rivalry =

National Football League rivalry

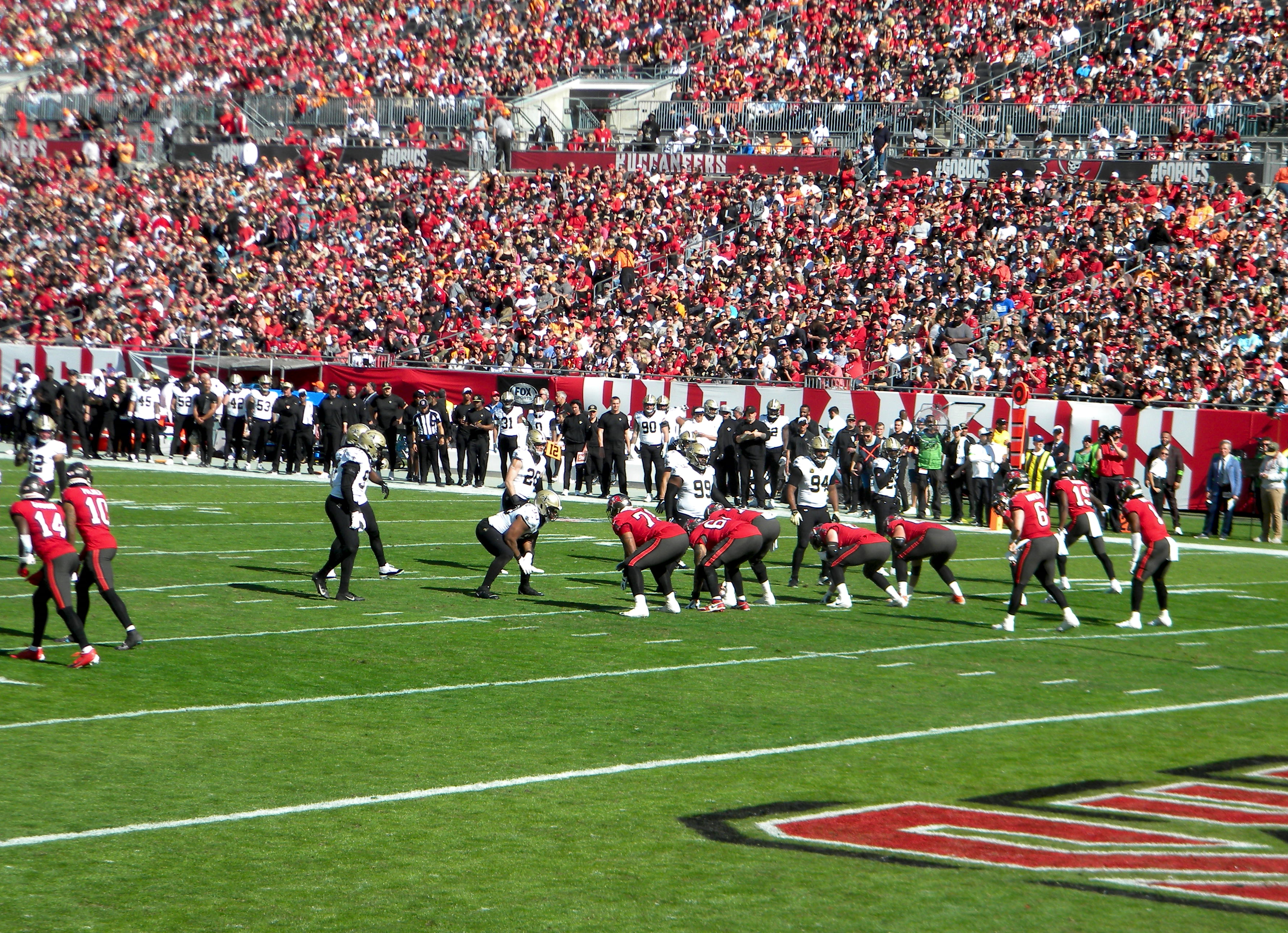
- Buccaneers and Saints face off during the 2023 season.

- Tampa Bay Buccaneers New Orleans Saints
- Location: Tampa, New Orleans
- First meeting: December 11, 1977; Buccaneers 33, Saints 14
- Latest meeting: December 7, 2025; Saints 24, Buccaneers 20
- Next meeting: December 20, 2026
- Stadiums: Buccaneers: Raymond James Stadium; Saints: Caesars Superdome

Statistics
- Total meetings: 69
- All-time series: Saints: 41–28
- Regular season series: Saints: 41–27
- Postseason results: Buccaneers: 1–0
- Largest victory: Buccaneers: 48–21 (2001); Saints: 41–0 (2012)
- Most points scored: Buccaneers: 51 (2024); Saints: 44 (1987)
- Longest win streak: Buccaneers: 3 (2022–2023, 2024–2025); Saints: 7 (2011–2014)
- Current win streak: Saints: 1 (2025–present)

Post-season history
- 2020 NFC Divisional: Buccaneers won: 30–20
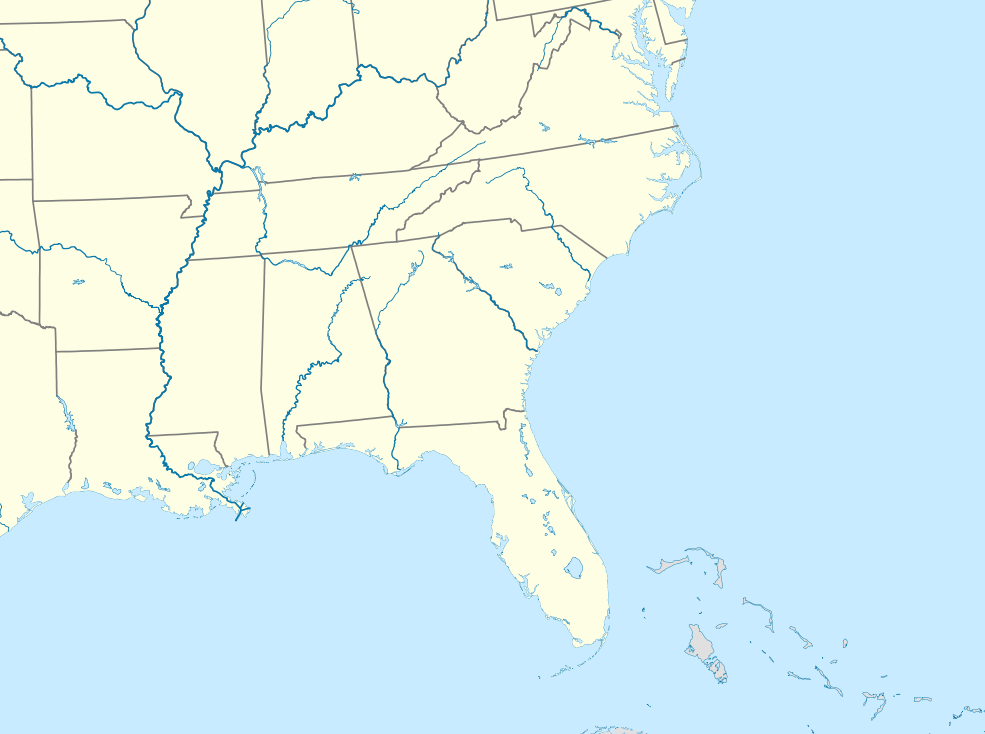

The Buccaneers–Saints rivalry is a National Football League (NFL) rivalry between the Tampa Bay Buccaneers and New Orleans Saints.

The two teams first met in the 1977 season, marking a significant moment for the Buccaneers as they achieved their first victory in franchise history after enduring a streak of 26 consecutive losses dating back to the previous season. Over the years, despite the Saints' inconsistent performance, they managed to gain an advantage in the overall series. The rivalry intensified when both teams were assigned to the newly established NFC South division in the 2002 season, resulting in two annual meetings. While the Buccaneers began to assert themselves with a strong defensive play, the Saints ultimately dominated the rivalry throughout the era of Sean Payton and Drew Brees, although the Buccaneers won the team’s lone playoff meeting at the end of this period.

The Saints lead the overall series, 41–28. The two teams have met once in the playoffs, with the Buccaneers winning.

== History ==
=== 1977 to 2001 ===
The first meeting between the two teams occurred on December 11, 1977. Tampa Bay, an expansion franchise in 1976, entered the game with a collective record of 0–26 over its first two seasons. Teams around league were fearful of earning the dubious distinction of becoming the Buccaneers’ first victim. Despite six shutouts in the previous nine weeks, the Tampa Bay defense was improving, and a win seemed imminent. New Orleans did not get a first down until midway through the second quarter, and did not get past midfield until nearly the end of the half. The Buccaneers began their first five drives in Saints territory, scoring on two Dave Green field goals, and a five-yard pass touchdown from Gary Huff to Morris Owens. Mike Washington made it 20–0 early in the second half, returning an interception 45 yards for a touchdown. The Buccaneers also recovered a fumble, and had six interceptions in all. Their three interception return touchdowns, with Richard Wood and Greg Johnson also scoring, tied an NFL record. The Buccaneers finally broke through with their first win in franchise history, ending their NFL-record losing streak at 26 games. Before the game, John McKay had read the team an article in which Saints quarterback Archie Manning stated that it would be disgraceful to lose to Tampa Bay. Inspired by the statements, Lee Roy Selmon and the Buccaneer defense yelled, "It's disgraceful! It's disgraceful!" at him as the clock wound down. After the game, Saints head coach Hank Stram lamented "What a nightmare. It was the worst experience of my coaching career. We're all ashamed for our people, for our fans, for our organization." Stram was fired the following week. Disgruntled Saints safety Tom Myers later said "We've been made the laughingstock of the business! I'm too embarrassed to say I play for the team that got beat by Tampa Bay!"

Tampa Bay surprised the league in 1979, turning around the club and starting the season 5–0. In Week 7, the Buccaneers hosted the Saints, and the game was scoreless at halftime. The Saints, however, scored 42 points in the second half to win 42–14. Archie Manning went 11 of 14 with a touchdown each rushing and passing. Mike Strachan rushed for two touchdowns. Despite the loss, Tampa Bay would advance to their first NFC Championship game. New Orleans would finish with a record of 8–8.

Despite not being in the same division, the Saints and Buccaneers played each other during every regular season from 1981 up to 1992. The Saints dominated the regular season series during that period, winning nine of twelve games. The twelve consecutive seasons is the longest streak of any pair of non-division opponents facing each other in NFL history.

In 1991, en route to their first NFC West division title, the Saints defeated the Buccaneers 23–7. The Buccaneers scored first, becoming the first team to score a touchdown against the Saints defense in 18 quarters. However, the Bucs were no match for the punishing Saints defense. Quarterback Chris Chandler threw two interceptions, fumbled once, and was sacked six times in defeat. The Saints now had won eight out of the last nine regular season meetings.

In 1998, the Buccaneers’ offense dropped seven passes, Patrick Hape lost a fumble at the Saints 3 yard line, and quarterback Trent Dilfer threw an interception, as offensive futility plagued the Tony Dungy-led Buccaneers. The Saints offensive numbers were not impressive either, but three field goals were enough for a 9–3 victory. Three times the Buccaneers had the ball inside the Saints 25 yard line, but came up with zero points.

In Week 15 of 2001, Tampa Bay entered the game against the Saints needing a victory to stay in playoff contention. Tampa Bay exploded with a record-setting performance against New Orleans. Aaron Stecker took back the opening kickoff a then-franchise record 86 yards, tackled on the Saints 14 yard line. Two plays later, Brad Johnson connected with Karl Williams for a 14-yard touchdown, and a lead the Buccaneers never surrendered. In the first half, Williams, Mike Alstott and Warrick Dunn each scored touchdowns, while Martin Gramatica added three field goals. to take a 30–0 lead into halftime. The scoring continued into the second half, as the Buccaneers would win 48–21. Tampa Bay would go on to clinch a playoff spot, but eventually lost to Philadelphia in the wild card round.

=== 2002–2009: Super Bowls for both teams ===
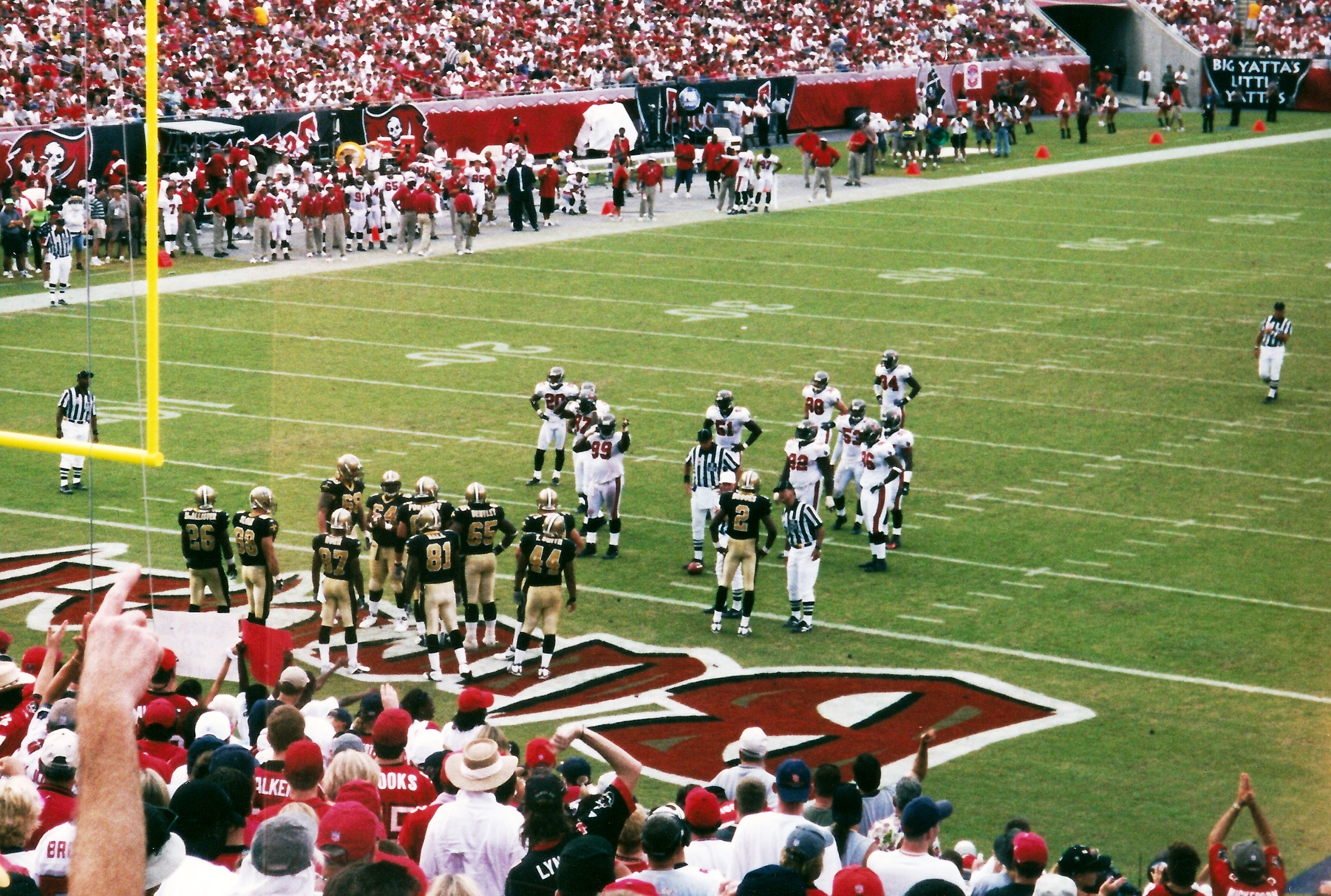
Game action between the Buccaneers and Saints at the 2002 Opening Day meeting.

After the 2002 NFL realignment, The Buccaneers and Saints were placed into the newly formed NFC South division. They became division foes, and would begin an annual two-game, home/away series each season.

In 2002, Tampa Bay began the Jon Gruden era with a home game against the Saints on a humid 90 °F afternoon. The Saints held a 20–10 lead late in the fourth quarter, while Tampa Bay's offense had sputtered. The Buccaneers rallied in the final three minutes to tie the score at 20–20 and force overtime. Late in overtime, Tampa Bay was pinned back at their own 5-yard line. Tom Tupa attempted to punt on 4th down from the endzone, but Saints defender Fred McAfee was unblocked. Tupa avoided the tackle, and attempted a desperation shovel pass to John Howell from his non-throwing arm. The ball was intercepted by James Allen, standing in the confines of the endzone for a game-winning touchdown.

During the second meeting, on Sunday Night Football on December 1, New Orleans swept the season series by a score of 23–20. Tampa Bay quarterback Brad Johnson was intercepted once, lost a fumble, and Aaron Stecker lost another fumble. Saints quarterback Aaron Brooks got off to a slow start, but heated up in the second and third periods, pulling out to a 20–9 lead which the Saints would not relinquish. Between the two games played amongst the clubs in 2002, Brooks had four touchdown passed against Tampa Bay's defense on the season; the rest of the league had three through ten games. Despite being swept by the Saints, the Buccaneers would go on to win Super Bowl XXXVII, while the Saints missed the playoffs.

In 2004, former Buccaneer Aaron Stecker returned the opening kickoff 98 yards for a Saints touchdown (something he never accomplished while playing for Tampa Bay) to lead the Saints to a 21–17 win in Tampa. The Buccaneers led 17–7 with just over three minutes to go, but late-game miscues on offense and defense sunk the Buccaneers. Aaron Brooks connected on two touchdowns in the final three minutes, lifting the Saints to victory.

The Saints struggled in the 2005 season due in part to their displacement from Hurricane Katrina. Tampa Bay swept the season series en route to a division championship. The game hosted by New Orleans was played at Tiger Stadium at Louisiana State University in Baton Rouge.

In 2006, the Saints swept the season series en route to their first appearance in the NFC Championship game later in the season. During the first meeting in Week 5, Tampa Bay entered the game winless, and was under the helm of rookie quarterback Bruce Gradkowski. Tampa Bay led 21–17 late in the fourth quarter when Reggie Bush returned a punt 65-yards for a touchdown to give the Saints a 24–21 victory. The second meeting of the season came in Week 9. The Saints prevailed by a score of 31–14, behind three touchdown passes by Drew Brees, including a 52-yard pass to Devery Henderson.

In 2007, Tampa Bay swept the season series for the second time. In week 2, Tampa Bay dominated, jumping out to a 28–0 lead, and held on for a 31–14 victory. In week 13, a dramatic finish saw Tampa Bay sweep the series, and put themselves in the driver's seat for the division title. The Saints led 21–20 with four minutes remaining in the game. Punter Steve Weatherford made a successful coffin corner punt which pinned the Buccaneers at their own 2-yard line. Two plays later, Will Smith sacked Luke McCown for a safety and a 23–20 lead. New Orleans tried to run out the clock out, but Reggie Bush fumbled and Jovan Haye recovered for Tampa Bay at the New Orleans 37-yard line. Six plays later Jerramy Stevens caught a 4-yard touchdown pass, and Tampa Bay won the game 27–23.

In 2009, New Orleans won the first meeting handily by a score of 38–7. In week 16, the two teams met at the Superdome, with Tampa Bay entering the game with a record of only 2–12. New Orleans was 13–1, and looking to secure home field advantage throughout the NFC playoffs. The Saints jumped out to a 17–3 lead after three quarters. In the fourth quarter, however, Tampa Bay rallied to tie the score at 17–17. In the final seconds, Saints kicker Garrett Hartley attempted a 37-yard field goal that would have won the game. In overtime, Tampa Bay won the coin toss and received. They rushed right down the field in eleven plays, and Connor Barth kicked a game-winning field goal on the first possession.

The game reflected back to the perceived "Tampa Bay Curse." No team had ever lost to the Buccaneers during the regular season and went on to win the Super Bowl that same year. The Saints still clinched home field advantage in the playoffs, and eventually advanced to Super Bowl XLIV, where they defeated the Indianapolis Colts to win their first championship, and likewise break the 33-year-old "Tampa Bay Curse."

=== 2010s ===
In 2012, the Saints swept the season series. During the first meeting, Tampa Bay was trailing by the score of 35–28. In the final seconds, Josh Freeman threw a potential game-tying touchdown pass in the back of the end zone to wide receiver Mike Williams, which would have sent the game to overtime with a successful PAT. However, officials ruled that Williams had stepped out-of-bounds before making the catch. Williams was penalized for illegal touching, which nullified the touchdown and ended the game. New Orleans held on to win 35–28. Later in the season, the Saints rolled by a score of 41–0, the biggest blowout in the series' history. It was also the first and, as of 2018, only shutout by either team in the series.

The Saints would also sweep the Buccaneers in 2013 and 2014, extending their winning streak over their rivals to seven games, the longest by either team in the series' history.

In Week 2 of 2015, The Buccaneers won in New Orleans, 26–19. It was rookie quarterback Jameis Winston's first NFL victory.

In 2017, the two teams met in Weeks 9 and 17. In the week 9 meeting, Winston promised his Buccaneers teammates to "eat a W" in his pregame speech. However, he was sidelined in the second half due to an injury, and Mike Evans was penalized for unnecessary roughness, after shoving Saints cornerback Marshon Lattimore to the ground for punching a helmet-less Winston seconds earlier for which he would later receive a one-game suspension. The Saints ended up winning that meeting 30–10. In the week 17, Tampa Bay scored a game-winning touchdown with 9 seconds left in regulation to upset the playoff-bound Saints. Though the Saints clinched the NFC South crown, the last-second loss effectively dropped the Saints from the #3 seed in the NFC playoffs to the #4 seed.

The teams met in the Superdome to open the 2018 campaign. Buccaneers' backup QB Ryan Fitzpatrick, starting for a suspended Winston, passed for 417 yards and four touchdowns to lead the Buccaneers to a surprising 48–40 win. In a losing effort, Drew Brees passed for 439 yards and three touchdowns, while Alvin Kamara added two rushing touchdowns. The 88 combined points in this game is the highest total in the series' history, and this game was the Saints' only loss in a 10–1 start to the season.

=== 2020s ===
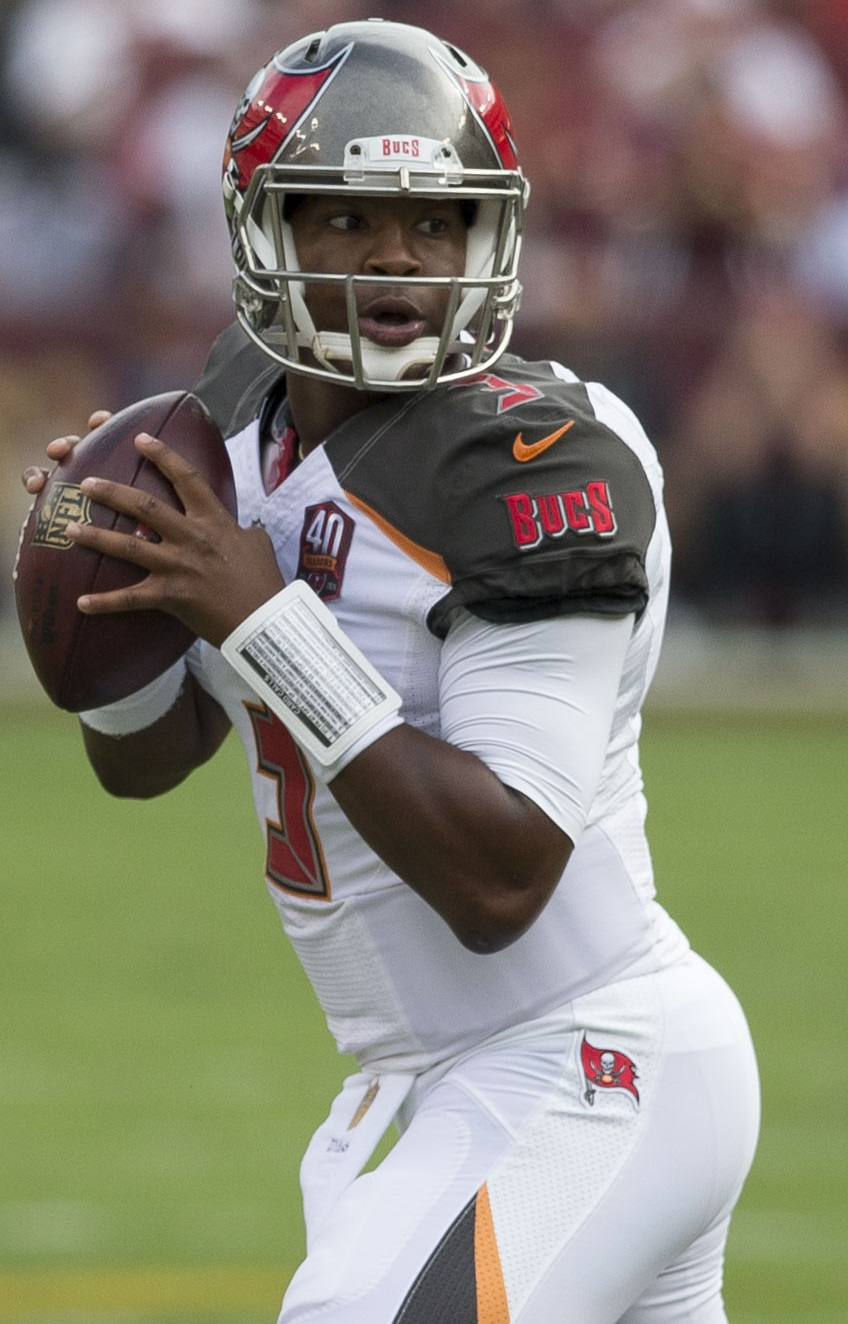
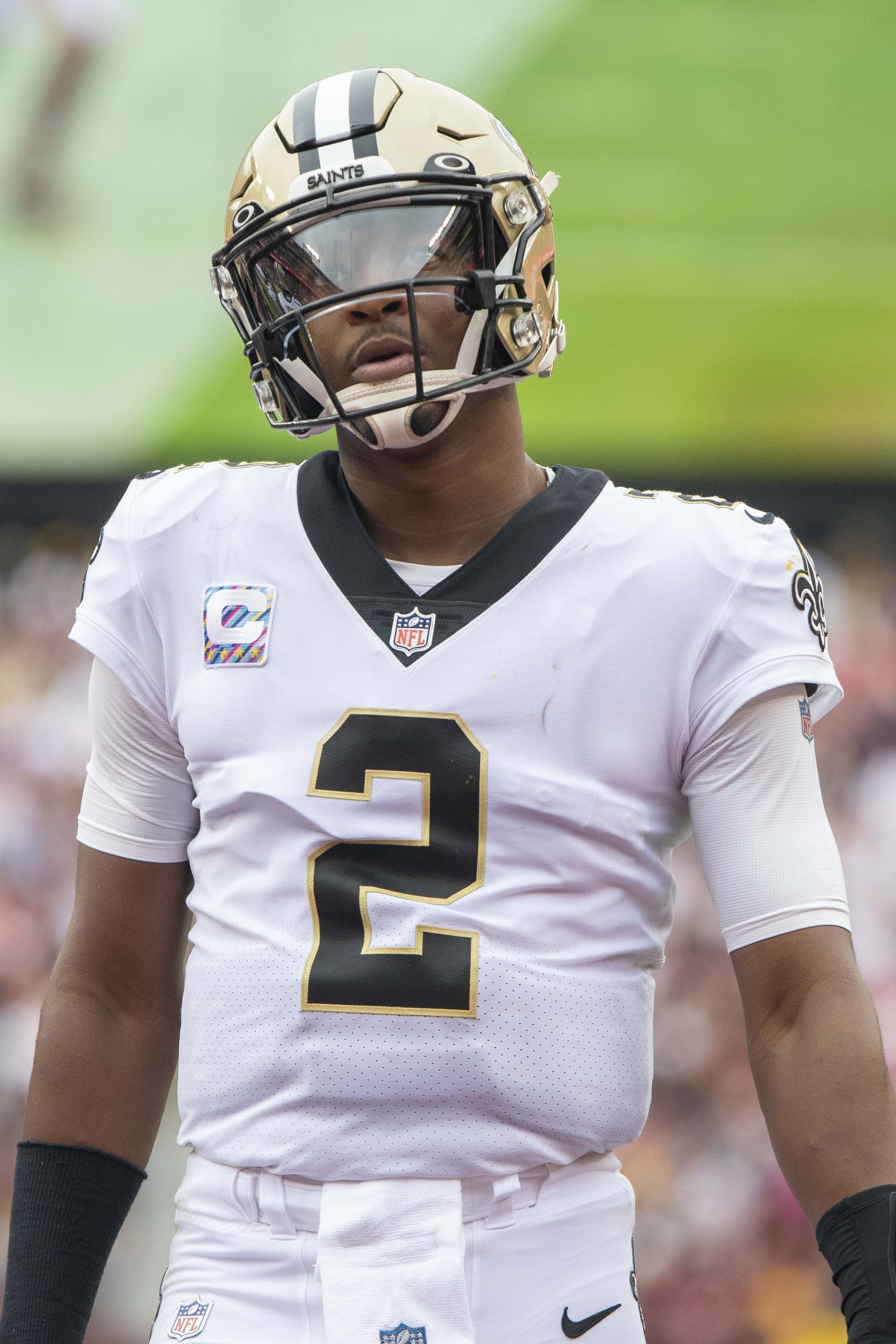
Quarterback Jameis Winston was selected first overall by the Tampa Bay Buccaneers in 2015 (left) and served as their starting quarterback for five seasons. After Tom Brady joined the Buccaneers, Winston signed with the New Orleans Saints in 2020 (right), ultimately taking on the role of starting quarterback following Drew Brees' retirement.

Jameis Winston was released from Tampa Bay and signed with the Saints for 2020. The Buccaneers signed Tom Brady in the 2020 offseason, and the rivalry continued to heat up when the Buccaneers were heavily favored to compete for the Super Bowl by the media. Saints defensive end Cameron Jordan was vocal in dismissing the Buccaneers' offseason additions, saying that Brady was "preparing for arthritis come Week 1", calling him the "second-best quarterback of all time", and even saying the Bucs were fighting for "second place" in the NFC South. He also referred to rookie offensive tackle Tristan Wirfs as "fresh meat" on Twitter on the night of the 2020 NFL draft, when the Buccaneers traded up to select him with the 13th overall pick. Brady effectively replaced Winston, adding more fuel to the fire.

In Week 1 of the 2020 season, New Orleans beat Tampa Bay 34–23, at the Superdome. The Buccaneers started strong jumping to a 7–0 lead in the first quarters, but two interceptions from Brady, including a Janoris Jenkins pick six, cost Tampa Bay.

The two teams met again at Raymond James Stadium on Sunday Night Football in Week 9, and the Saints would beat the Buccaneers, 38-3, the most lopsided loss of Brady's career. The win resulted in a regular season sweep for the Saints, marking the first time Brady was swept by a divisional rival. The game was a turning point for both teams as the Buccaneers, who were first place in the NFC South coming into the game, dropped to second in the division and sparked a two-game losing streak. Meanwhile the Saints, who had struggled during the 2020 regular season, returned to their dominance they had seen the previous three seasons. The win for the Saints ultimately culminated in a fourth consecutive NFC South championship. The game was also a bounce back game for Michael Thomas, who only caught 3 passes for 17 yards and no touchdowns in Week 1 before suffering an ankle injury that kept him out until the teams' second meeting. The Saints gained attention for dancing in the Buccaneers' locker room, Jordan continuing to talk trash, and Winston "eating a W" as he did to motivate the Bucs to beat New Orleans before their 2017 Week 9 matchup. Their celebration, however, was later found to be in violation of the league's COVID-19 policies, and they were ultimately fined $500,000 and were stripped of a seventh-round draft pick in the 2021 NFL draft. The Saints finished the season with a 12-4 record and the Buccaneers finished 11-5, with both teams earning a playoff berth.

Following a Buccaneers road win at Washington and a Saints home win against the Bears, the two teams would meet for a third time in the NFC Divisional Round on January 17, 2021. Drew Brees said the matchup was "inevitable" and Tom Brady teased the game on his Instagram page, stating "Round 2 next, who do you guys want to us play? I think I know."

After being swept by the Saints in the regular season, the Buccaneers would ultimately win the Divisional Round game by a final score of 30–20, then proceeded to beat the top-seeded Packers at Lambeau Field en route to their Super Bowl LV win over the Chiefs. Brady scored three total touchdowns (two passing, one rushing), while Brees threw three interceptions and Michael Thomas was held to no catches against a stout Buccaneers defense. This game would ultimately turn out to be Brees' final game, as he announced his retirement from the NFL on March 14, 2021.

The following season, the Saints' streak of four straight NFC South division titles was snapped by the Buccaneers after their Week 16 victory over the Carolina Panthers, despite the Saints sweeping the Bucs again. In Week 15, the Saints outdid last year's game in Tampa Bay shutting the Buccaneers out 9–0, and then Saints safety C. J. Gardner-Johnson went viral for taunting Tom Brady in his face. New Orleans would miss the playoffs, while Tampa Bay would lose to the Rams in the Divisional Round of the playoffs. Injuries added fuel to the fire as in Week 8, Jameis Winston suffered a torn ACL and damaged MCL after being horse-collared by linebacker Devin White. In Week 15, Chris Godwin suffered a torn ACL and concussion after being hit in the legs by P. J. Williams and Leonard Fournette's hamstring was injured after being brought to the ground by Christian Ringo.

In Week 2 of the 2022 NFL season, the Saints hosted Tampa Bay and tempers flared once more between Evans and Lattimore. With 12:55 remaining in the fourth quarter, Brady complained to the ref after no flag was called when Marshon Lattimore committed defensive pass interference on Scotty Miller. Lattimore taunted Brady, before Brady approached him. Leonard Fournette shoved Lattimore, who retaliated by throwing a punch at Fournette. In an action reminiscent of their 2017 scuffle, Evans again shoved Lattimore to the ground and a fight ensued on the field before he and Lattimore were ejected. The Bucs would win the game 20-10. Interviewed by Erin Andrews after the game, White took a shot at Winston. Stating, "When Jameis left our team, everybody knows what he did that last year. And we feel like we had a great defense then, and he threw thirty picks, you know. And we just knew he'd give us the ball...and that's something we came in talking about, we want thirty turnovers as a ball club ourselves." Evans was later suspended for one game as a result of his actions.

In Week 13 of 2022, Tampa Bay hosted New Orleans on Monday Night Football. The Saints held a 16–3 lead with under 5 minutes left in regulation. Tom Brady drove the Bucs 91 yards for a touchdown, and trimmed the deficit to 16–10 with 3 minutes to go. The Bucs defense forced a three-and-out, and got the ball back with 2:29 left. Brady threw the game-winning touchdown pass to Rachaad White with 3 seconds left to win 17–16.

Jordan again took shots at the Buccaneers, saying that "Tampa Bay will probably go back to where Tampa Bay has been" when interviewed at the 2023 Pro Bowl Games. Tampa Bay won a 26–9 victory in Week 4 of the 2023 season, marking the first time in regular season series history that the Buccaneers beat the Saints three games in a row. After the game, many players dismissed Jordan's comments, with Tristan Wirfs stating "I guess it's not much of a rivalry anymore, according to 94...For them to downplay it? It's a division game. There's always going to be a lot behind it." Quarterback Baker Mayfield chimed in, stating postgame interviews, ""It's a passionate rivalry, whether they want to admit it or not."

In the 2024 season, the Buccaneers adjusted their travel plans for their game against the Saints in New Orleans on October 13 because of Hurricane Milton. Despite the unforeseen shift in logistics, the Buccaneers delivered a commanding performance, defeating the Saints 51–27. This victory marked a new franchise record for their most points scored in a game against the Saints, and they finished with 594 total yards, setting a franchise record for their most yards in a game.

== Season-by-season results ==
Tampa Bay Buccaneers vs. New Orleans Saints Season-by-Season Results
1970s (Saints, 2–1)

| Season | Results | Location | Overall series | Notes |
|---|---|---|---|---|
| 1977 | Buccaneers; 33–14 | Louisiana Superdome | Buccaneers; 1–0 | Buccaneers join the National Football League (NFL) as an expansion team in the 1976 season and were placed in the AFC West. The following season, they were moved to the NFC Central. Buccaneers recorded their first win in franchise history and snapped a 26-game losing streak dating back to the previous season, setting an NFL record post-merge. |
| 1978 | Saints; 17–10 | Tampa Stadium | Tie; 1–1 | |
| 1979 | Saints; 42–14 | Tampa Stadium | Saints; 2–1 | |

1980s (Saints, 6–3)

| Season | Results | Location | Overall series | Notes |
|---|---|---|---|---|
| 1981 | Buccaneers; 31–14 | Louisiana Superdome | Tie; 2–2 | |
| 1982 | Buccaneers; 13–10 | Louisiana Superdome | Buccaneers; 3–2 | |
| 1983 | Saints; 24–21 | Tampa Stadium | Tie; 3–3 | Road team wins the first 6 straight meetings of the series. |
| 1984 | Saints; 17–13 | Louisiana Superdome | Saints; 4–3 | Saints record their first home win against the Buccaneers. |
| 1985 | Saints; 20–13 | Louisiana Superdome | Saints; 5–3 | |
| 1986 | Saints; 38–7 | Louisiana Superdome | Saints; 6–3 | |
| 1987 | Saints; 44–34 | Louisiana Superdome | Saints; 7–3 | The Saints score their most points in a game against the Buccaneers. Saints also clinch first playoff berth in franchise history. |
| 1988 | Saints; 13–9 | Louisiana Superdome | Saints; 8–3 | |
| 1989 | Buccaneers; 20–10 | Tampa Stadium | Saints; 8–4 | Buccaneers record their first home win against the Saints. |

1990s (Saints, 5–2)

| Season | Results | Location | Overall series | Notes |
|---|---|---|---|---|
| 1990 | Saints; 35–7 | Louisiana Superdome | Saints; 9–4 | |
| 1991 | Saints; 23–7 | Louisiana Superdome | Saints; 10–4 | |
| 1992 | Saints; 23–21 | Louisiana Superdome | Saints; 11–4 | Home team wins 9 straight meetings (1984–1992). Both teams faced each other for 12 consecutive seasons despite not being in the same division (1981–1992), setting an NFL record. |
| 1994 | Saints; 9–7 | Tampa Stadium | Saints; 12–4 | |
| 1996 | Buccaneers; 13–7 | Tampa Stadium | Saints; 12–5 | |
| 1998 | Saints; 9–3 | Louisiana Superdome | Saints; 13–5 | Buccaneers open Raymond James Stadium. Saints win nine straight home meetings (1984–1998). |
| 1999 | Buccaneers; 31–16 | Louisiana Superdome | Saints; 13–6 | |

2000s (Buccaneers, 9–8)

| Season | Season series | at Tampa Bay Buccaneers | at New Orleans Saints | Overall series | Notes |
|---|---|---|---|---|---|
| 2001 | Buccaneers 1–0 | Buccaneers; 48–21 | no game | Saints; 13–7 | Buccaneers record their largest victory against the Saints with a 27–point differential. |
| 2002 | Saints 2–0 | Saints; 26–20 (OT) | Saints; 23–20 | Saints; 15–7 | During the NFL realignment, the Buccaneers and Saints are moved into the newly formed NFC South, resulting in two meetings annually. Game in Tampa is the first overtime result in the series. Buccaneers clinched the inaugural NFC South title following the Saints' loss to the Bengals. Buccaneers win Super Bowl XXXVII. |
| 2003 | Tie 1–1 | Saints; 17–14 | Buccaneers; 14–7 | Saints; 16–8 | |
| 2004 | Tie 1–1 | Saints; 21–17 | Buccaneers; 20–17 | Saints; 17–9 | |
| 2005 | Buccaneers 2–0 | Buccaneers; 27–13 | Buccaneers; 10–3 | Saints; 17–11 | Due to Hurricane Katrina, Saints' home game is moved to Tiger Stadium in Baton Rouge. In Tampa, the Buccaneers clinched the NFC South with their win. |
| 2006 | Saints 2–0 | Saints; 31–14 | Saints; 24–21 | Saints; 19–11 | Saints trade for Chargers' QB Drew Brees. |
| 2007 | Buccaneers 2–0 | Buccaneers; 31–14 | Buccaneers; 27–23 | Saints; 19–13 | |
| 2008 | Tie 1–1 | Buccaneers; 23–20 | Saints; 24–20 | Saints; 20–14 | |
| 2009 | Tie 1–1 | Saints; 38–7 | Buccaneers; 20–17 (OT) | Saints; 21–15 | In New Orleans, Buccaneers overcame a 17–0 deficit. Saints win Super Bowl XLIV, becoming the first team to lose to the Buccaneers in the regular season and go on to win the Super Bowl, ending the "Tampa Bay curse." |

2010s (Saints, 14–6)

| Season | Season series | at Tampa Bay Buccaneers | at New Orleans Saints | Overall series | Notes |
|---|---|---|---|---|---|
| 2010 | Tie 1–1 | Saints; 31–6 | Buccaneers; 23–13 | Saints; 22–16 | |
| 2011 | Tie 1–1 | Buccaneers; 26–20 | Saints; 27–16 | Saints; 23–17 | Buccaneers' win would be their last of the season, as they ended the season on a 10-game losing streak. |
| 2012 | Saints 2–0 | Saints; 35–28 | Saints; 41–0 | Saints; 25–17 | In New Orleans, Saints record their largest victory against the Buccaneers with a 41–point differential. |
| 2013 | Saints 2–0 | Saints; 16–14 | Saints; 42–17 | Saints; 27–17 | In New Orleans, the Saints clinch the final playoff berth with their win. |
| 2014 | Saints 2–0 | Saints; 23–20 | Saints; 37–31 (OT) | Saints; 29–17 | In New Orleans, Saints overcame a 31–20 fourth-quarter deficit. In Tampa, Saints overcame a 20–7 fourth-quarter deficit. |
| 2015 | Tie 1–1 | Saints; 24–17 | Buccaneers; 26–19 | Saints; 30–18 | |
| 2016 | Tie 1–1 | Buccaneers; 16–11 | Saints; 31–24 | Saints; 31–19 | |
| 2017 | Tie 1–1 | Buccaneers; 31–24 | Saints; 30–10 | Saints; 32–20 | In Tampa, the Buccaneers scored the game-winning touchdown with 9 seconds left. |
| 2018 | Tie 1–1 | Saints; 28–14 | Buccaneers; 48–40 | Saints; 33–21 | The game in New Orleans is the highest-scoring game in the rivalry and the 23rd highest-scoring game in NFL history (88 points). Saints clinch the NFC South with their win. |
| 2019 | Saints 2–0 | Saints; 34–17 | Saints; 31–24 | Saints; 35–21 | |

2020s (Buccaneers, 7–6)

| Season | Season series | at Tampa Bay Buccaneers | at New Orleans Saints | Overall series | Notes |
|---|---|---|---|---|---|
| 2020 | Saints 2–0 | Saints; 38–3 | Saints; 34–23 | Saints; 37–21 | Buccaneers sign Patriots' QB Tom Brady. In Tampa, Saints hand Tom Brady his worst margin of defeat in his career. |
| 2020 Playoffs | Buccaneers 1–0 | —N/a | Buccaneers; 30–20 | Saints; 37–22 | NFC Divisional Round. Final game for Saints' QB Drew Brees. Buccaneers go on to win Super Bowl LV. |
| 2021 | Saints 2–0 | Saints; 9–0 | Saints; 36–27 | Saints; 39–22 | In New Orleans, Saints quarterback and former Buccaneers quarterback Jameis Winston suffers season-ending torn ACL. |
| 2022 | Buccaneers 2–0 | Buccaneers; 17–16 | Buccaneers; 20–10 | Saints; 39–24 | In Tampa, the Buccaneers overcame a 16–3 fourth-quarter deficit. Buccaneers' first season series sweep of the Saints since the 2007 season. |
| 2023 | Tie 1–1 | Saints; 23−13 | Buccaneers; 26–9 | Saints; 40–25 | Both teams finished with 9–8 records, but the Buccaneers clinched the NFC South due to a better record against common opponents. |
| 2024 | Buccaneers 2−0 | Buccaneers; 27−19 | Buccaneers; 51−27 | Saints; 40–27 | In New Orleans, the Buccaneers scored their most points in a game against the Saints. They also finished with 594 total yards, setting a franchise record for most yards in a game. In Tampa, the Buccaneers clinched the NFC South title with their win. |
| 2025 | Tie 1–1 | Saints; 24−20 | Buccaneers; 23−3 | Saints; 41–28 | |
| 2026 | | December 20 | January 9/10 | Saints; 41–28 | |

Summary of Results

| Season | Season series | at Tampa Bay Buccaneers | at New Orleans Saints | Notes |
|---|---|---|---|---|
| Regular season | Saints 41–27 | Saints 20–11 | Saints 21–16 | Buccaneers are 1–0 at Tiger Stadium in Baton Rouge, Louisiana (2005), accounted for as a New Orleans Saints home game. |
| Postseason | Buccaneers 1–0 | no games | Buccaneers 1–0 | NFC Divisional: 2020 |
| Regular and postseason | Saints 41–28 | Saints 20–11 | Saints 21–17 | |

== See also ==
- List of NFL rivalries
- NFC South
- Florida–LSU football rivalry

== Notes ==
=== Works cited ===
- Tampa Bay Buccaneers Media Guide
- BucPower.com
