= Jeb Blount =

American football player (born 1954)

No. 17
- Position: Quarterback

Personal information
- Born: July 12, 1954 (age 72); Tyler, Texas, U.S.
- Listed height: 6 ft 3 in (1.91 m)
- Listed weight: 200 lb (91 kg)

Career information
- High school: Longview (TX)
- College: Tulsa
- NFL draft: 1976: 2nd round, 50th overall pick

Career history
- Oakland Raiders (1976); Tampa Bay Buccaneers (1977); Denver Broncos (1979)*
- * Offseason or practice squad member only

Awards and highlights
- Super Bowl champion (XI)

Career NFL statistics
- Passing attempts: 89
- Passing completions: 37
- Completion percentage: 41.6%
- TD–INT: 0–7
- Passing yards: 522
- Passer rating: 28.4
- Stats at Pro Football Reference

John Eugene "Jeb" Blount (born July 12, 1954) is an American former professional football player who was a quarterback in the National Football League (NFL). He was selected by the Oakland Raiders in the second round of the 1976 NFL draft. He played college football for the Tulsa Golden Hurricane, completing 320 of 588 passes for 4,372 yards and 35 touchdowns in three seasons as a starter. He was an honorable mention All-American, and American Bowl MVP following his senior season. He claimed to have developed his passing accuracy while herding cattle on his parents' ranch. He would spook the lead bull by hitting him in the head with a football, at which point the entire herd would follow. He lives in Longview, Texas.

Blount spent the 1976 season on injured reserve with an ankle injury. He was waived prior to the 1977 NFL season. He was claimed by several teams, but the NFL awarded the Tampa Bay Buccaneers his rights. The Bucs were short at quarterback, having suffered a string of quarterback injuries during the preseason. This resulted in a starting opportunity for Blount, who beat Parnell Dickinson for the third quarterback spot and rotated at starting quarterback with Gary Huff and Randy Hedberg throughout the 1977 season.

Blount was inducted into the Tulsa Hall of Fame in its 2021 Class. Blount was inducted with basketball coach Tubby Smith, Michelle Sechser (rowing), Chris O’Hare (men's track and cross country) and Ryan Pore (men's soccer) – along with the 1971 Tulsa baseball team.

Blount is one of four Longview High School graduates to be on a Super Bowl team.
