= Parnell Dickinson =

American football player (born 1953)

No. 18
- Position: Quarterback

Personal information
- Born: March 14, 1953 (age 73); Brighton, Alabama, U.S.
- Listed height: 6 ft 2 in (1.88 m)
- Listed weight: 185 lb (84 kg)

Career information
- High school: Brighton
- College: Mississippi Valley State (1972–1975)
- NFL draft: 1976: 7th round, 183rd overall pick

Career history
- Tampa Bay Buccaneers (1976–1977); New England Patriots (1978)*
- * Offseason or practice squad member only

Awards and highlights
- Mississippi Valley State Delta Devils No. 18 retired

Career NFL statistics
- Passing attempts: 39
- Passing completions: 15
- Completion percentage: 38.5%
- TD–INT: 1–5
- Passing yards: 210
- Passer rating: 25.5
- Stats at Pro Football Reference

Parnell Dickinson (born March 14, 1953) is an American former professional football player who was a quarterback in the National Football League (NFL) for one season. Over the course of his career, he played in eight games for the Tampa Bay Buccaneers, completed 15 of 39 passes for 210 yards, threw one touchdown and five interceptions, and finished his career with a passer rating of 25.5.

A four-year starting quarterback at Mississippi Valley State University, Dickinson was the first quarterback drafted by the Buccaneers in franchise history, taken in the seventh round of the 1976 NFL draft. He served as the backup quarterback behind Steve Spurrier his rookie season, and saw playing time in eight games, including one start against the Miami Dolphins. In his start vs Miami, Dickinson threw the first touchdown pass by a Tampa Bay quarterback in franchise history.

His season ended after suffering an injury in a game against the Cleveland Browns. He recovered from the injury and tried to make the team in 1977, but was cut, ending his career. After retiring, he became a high school offensive coordinator in Tampa.

== College career ==
Dickinson played college football for the Mississippi Valley State Delta Devils. He was the quarterback for the team during his freshman year in 1972. His performances that season included a game against the Southern Jaguars where he completed 15 of 31 passes for 180 yards and rushed for two touchdowns in a 23–13 win. At the end of the season, Dickinson was named to the National Association of Intercollegiate Athletics (NAIA) all-star team as a quarterback alongside Ralph Brock. In his sophomore year, Dickinson was awarded the team's top sportsman award, given to the player with the best attitude and morale.

In 1974, his junior year, Dickinson threw for 1,667 yards and 21 touchdowns over the course of the season. In his first three seasons, he led the Southwestern Athletic Conference in total offense. Dickinson's performances his senior year included a comeback victory over Prairie View A&M, when he threw a touchdown pass with just over a minute left to win the game, 27–26 after being down 26–14 with under four minutes left. After the season ended, he was named to the Black College All-American football team for the second year in a row.

== Professional career ==
After graduating from college, Dickinson was selected by the expansion Tampa Bay Buccaneers with the 183rd overall pick in the seventh round of the 1976 NFL draft. Buccaneers' head coach John McKay said that Dickinson was considered the second best prospect on his draft board behind Richard Todd. Steve Spurrier had the starting job wrapped up when he was signed to the team, and as a result Dickinson spent the offseason competing for a backup quarterback spot alongside Bill Cappleman and James Foote. Dickinson started off training camp by throwing the hardest passes of the four quarterbacks, and had a few accuracy issues in the process. Dickinson served as the second-string quarterback throughout the preseason. In a game against the Green Bay Packers, he led the Buccaneers to their first touchdown as a team. By the end of preseason, his place was on the roster was solidified behind Spurrier, as Cappleman and Foote were cut and replaced by Gary Valbuena and Larry Lawrence.

Dickinson completed one of five passes for 15 yards in his first professional game against the Houston Oilers after coming in for Spurrier late in the game. The following week, the Buccaneers faced the San Diego Chargers. In that game, Dickinson again came into the game, rushing three times for 54 yards and throwing an interception that was returned by Tom Hayes for a touchdown. He did not play against the Buffalo Bills the following week, but Spurrier ended up getting injured, meaning that Dickinson was slated to possibly get his first NFL start against the Baltimore Colts. Spurrier ended up starting the game, but Dickinson did see playing time against the Colts, completing one of five passes for 12 yards and throwing an interception in a 42–17 loss; he attempted only one pass the following week in a game against the Cincinnati Bengals.

Two weeks after the Bengals' game, Dickinson was slated to start against the Miami Dolphins on October 24, becoming the team's first African-American starting quarterback. In the game, he completed all four passes he attempted for 51 yards, and led a 71-yard touchdown drive. However, he suffered a twisted foot and ankle during the game, and was sidelined for what was then an indefinite amount of time. Dickinson returned two weeks later, failing to complete a pass in a game against the Denver Broncos, and allowing another interception that was returned by John Rowser for a touchdown. Dickinson had his most productive outing the following week, completing 7 of 13 passes for 103 yards in a loss to the New York Jets. His last game of the season was against the Cleveland Browns. He completed two of three passes for 29 yards in the fourth quarter. After completing the first two passes, he was intercepted by Terry Brown and was hit late after throwing the pass. The result was torn ligaments in his left knee, which ended his season. Despite the season-ending injury, there was still optimism about Dickinson being the Buccaneers' quarterback of the future due to his scrambling ability.

Dickinson went through knee surgery during the offseason, but there was still concern about whether he had a future in the NFL. That was set aside when he was considered to be progressing well in his recovery as of early July 1977. During the Buccaneers' offseason, the quarterbacks on the roster changed entirely, with Dickinson being the only holdover; Gary Huff was now the starter, and Dickinson was fighting for a backup role alongside Mike Boryla and Randy Hedberg. After the Buccaneers lost Boryla and Huff to injuries, the former for the season, Dickinson ended up being the starting quarterback for the team's final preseason game against the Bills. In the game, Dickinson completed 2 of 12 passes for -2 yards and was sacked three times in a 17–6 loss. A week after the game against the Bills, Dickinson was released by the Buccaneers along with four other players. The Buccaneers re-signed him after Huff got injured in late October, but Dickinson was again released a couple weeks later.

In 1978, Dickinson signed with the New England Patriots. Their quarterback situation was set, and in order to make his way onto an NFL roster, he joined the team as a wide receiver. He was released from the team a month later, and ended his career with the Hamilton Tiger-Cats of the Canadian Football League.

== Later life ==
After retiring from football, Dickinson became an insurance salesman and opened two daycare centers. He also became offensive coordinator at Tampa Catholic High School in the 1980s after being recruited by fellow Buccaneer Dave Lewis. In 1992, Dickinson became an inaugural member of the Southwestern Athletic Conference Hall of Fame.

== See also ==
- Racial issues faced by black quarterbacks
