= Nate Simpson =

American football player (born 1954)

No. 48
- Position: Running back

Personal information
- Born: November 30, 1954 (age 71); Nashville, Tennessee, U.S.
- Listed height: 5 ft 11 in (1.80 m)
- Listed weight: 189 lb (86 kg)

Career information
- High school: East Nashville
- College: Tennessee State
- NFL draft: 1977: 5th round, 122nd overall pick

Career history
- Green Bay Packers (1977–1979); Chicago Bears (1981)*
- * Offseason or practice squad member only

Career NFL statistics
- Rushing attempts: 153
- Rushing yards: 497
- Receptions: 17
- Receiving yards: 69
- Total TDs: 1
- Stats at Pro Football Reference

Nate Simpson (born November 30, 1954) is an American former professional football player who was a running back in the National Football League (NFL). He played college football for the Tennessee State Tigers. Simpson was selected by the Green Bay Packers in the fifth round of the 1977 NFL draft and played three seasons with the team.
