= Greg Johnson (defensive lineman) =

American football player (born 1953)

No. 79, 72
- Position: Defensive end

Personal information
- Born: December 3, 1953 (age 72); Leesburg, Florida, U.S.
- Listed height: 6 ft 4 in (1.93 m)
- Listed weight: 240 lb (109 kg)

Career information
- High school: Leesburg
- College: Florida State
- NFL draft: 1976: 5th round, 135th overall pick

Career history
- Philadelphia Eagles (1976)*; Chicago Bears (1977)*; Baltimore Colts (1977); Tampa Bay Buccaneers (1977)
- * Offseason or practice squad member only

Career NFL statistics
- Interceptions: 1
- Defensive TDs: 1
- Stats at Pro Football Reference

Gregory Devon Johnson (born December 3, 1953) is an American former professional football player who was a defensive lineman in the National Football League (NFL). He played college football for the Florida State Seminoles and was selected by the Philadelphia Eagles in the fifth round of the 1976 NFL draft. Johnson had brief stints with several teams, appearing in games for the Baltimore Colts and Tampa Bay Buccaneers in 1977.
