= Allan Leavitt =

American football player (born 1955)

No. 9
- Position: Placekicker

Personal information
- Born: October 22, 1955 (age 71); St. Petersburg, Florida, U.S.
- Listed height: 5 ft 11 in (1.80 m)
- Listed weight: 176 lb (80 kg)

Career information
- High school: Hernando (Brooksville, Florida)
- College: Georgia
- NFL draft: 1977: 4th round, 90th overall pick

Career history
- Tampa Bay Buccaneers (1977)

Awards and highlights
- First-team All-SEC (1976); Second-team All-SEC (1974)
- Stats at Pro Football Reference

Allan Leavitt (born October 22, 1955) is an American former professional football placekicker. He played for the Tampa Bay Buccaneers in 1977.
