= Morris Owens =

American football player (born 1953)

No. 82, 85
- Position: Wide receiver

Personal information
- Born: February 14, 1953 (age 73); Oakland, California, U.S.
- Listed height: 6 ft 0 in (1.83 m)
- Listed weight: 190 lb (86 kg)

Career information
- High school: Chowchilla (CA)
- College: Arizona State
- NFL draft: 1975: 5th round, 106th overall pick

Career history
- Miami Dolphins (1975–1976); Tampa Bay Buccaneers (1976-1979)

Career NFL statistics
- Receptions: 116
- Receiving yards: 2,062
- Receiving touchdowns: 14
- Stats at Pro Football Reference

Morris Owens (born February 14, 1953) is an American former professional football player who was a wide receiver in the National Football League (NFL). He played college football for the Arizona State Sun Devils. He played in the NFL for the Miami Dolphins from 1975 to 1976 and for the Tampa Bay Buccaneers from 1976 to 1979.
