= Randy Hedberg =

American football player and coach (born 1954)

Current position
- Title: Associate head coach & quarterbacks coach
- Team: North Dakota State
- Conference: MVFC

Biographical details
- Born: December 27, 1954 (age 71); Parshall, North Dakota, U.S.

Playing career

Football
- 1973–1976: Minot State
- 1977–1978: Tampa Bay Buccaneers
- 1979*: Oakland Raiders
- 1980*: Green Bay Packers
- Position: Quarterback

Coaching career (HC unless noted)

Football
- 1979–1981: Minot State (assistant)
- 1982–1989: Minot State
- 1990–1995: Central Missouri (AHC/OC/QB)
- 1996–1998: North Dakota (OC/QB/WR)
- 1999–2007: St. Cloud State
- 2008–2013: Southern Illinois (QB)
- 2014–2018: North Dakota State (QB)
- 2019–present: North Dakota State (AHC/PGC/QB)

Basketball
- 1985: Minot State

Head coaching record
- Overall: 92–75–2 (football); 8–18 (basketball)
- Tournaments: Football; 0–1 (NCAA D-II playoffs)

Accomplishments and honors

Championships
- Football; 2 NDCAC (1983, 1985)

Randy R. Hedberg (born December 27, 1954) is an American football coach and former player. He is the associate head coach and quarterbacks coach at North Dakota State University. Hedberg played as a quarterback for the Tampa Bay Buccaneers of the National Football League (NFL) in 1977. He was the head football coach at Minot State University, his alma mater, from 1982 to 1989 and St. Cloud State University from 1999 to 2007, compiling a career college football record of 92–75–2 (.550).

Hedberg's 90 NFL pass attempts are the most by a quarterback with a career passer rating of 0.0.

== Early life, playing career, and education ==
Born and raised in Parshall, North Dakota, southwest of Minot, Hedberg graduated from Parshall High School in 1973. He played college football at Minot State College, an NAIA school, from 1973 to 1976. He was a four-year letter winner in football, basketball, and baseball for the Beavers, and earned a bachelor's degree in physical education in 1977. He earned a master's degree from the University of North Dakota in 1987.

Hedberg was selected in the eighth round (196th overall) in the 1977 NFL draft by Tampa Bay, the eleventh quarterback selected. He saw significant playing time in his rookie season in 1977, appearing in seven games and starting four, including the season opener. As of 2023, no rookie quarterback drafted lower than Hedberg has been a team's starting quarterback in Week 1. He did not play well; his final stat line for the season was 25 completions on 90 attempts (a 27.8% completion percentage), with zero touchdowns and 10 interceptions.

On injured reserve the following year, he was traded in February 1979 to Oakland; briefly with Raiders and Green Bay, he did not see any regular season playing time.

Hedberg was selected as #31 in Sports Illustrated's "50 Greatest Sports Figures in North Dakota."

== Coaching career ==
Following his playing career, he was an assistant coach at his alma mater, Minot State, from 1979 to 1981, and its head coach from 1982 to 1989, compiling a 45–24–2 (.648) record in eight seasons. He then became the offensive coordinator and quarterbacks coach at Central Missouri State University (1990–1995) and at the University of North Dakota (1996–1998) in Grand Forks. He returned to the head coaching ranks in 1999 at St. Cloud State University, a Division II program in central Minnesota, compiling a 47–51 (.480) record in nine seasons. His overall record as a head coach stands at 92–75–2 (.550) in 17 seasons.

Hedberg was the quarterbacks coach at Southern Illinois University Carbondale. He was hired in February 2008. After the 2013 season, he signed on to be the quarterbacks coach at North Dakota State University. Here, Hedberg would coach Carson Wentz, who went on to become the second overall pick by the Philadelphia Eagles in the 2016 NFL draft. Hedberg also coached Easton Stick, a fifth-round pick in the 2019 NFL draft by the Los Angeles Chargers; and Trey Lance, the third overall pick by the San Francisco 49ers in the 2021 NFL draft.

== Honors and family ==
Hedberg was inducted into Minot State's hall of fame in 1985. He was named the American Football Coaches Association (AFCA) FCS Assistant coach of the year award in 2021.

Hedberg has four children: Jennifer, Kate, Christopher, and Maddie.

== Head coaching record ==
=== Football ===
| Year | Team | Overall | Conference | Standing | Bowl/playoffs |
|---|---|---|---|---|---|
Minot State Beavers (North Dakota College Athletic Conference) (1982–1989)
| 1982 | Minot State | 4–4 | 3–3 | T–4th | |
| 1983 | Minot State | 7–2 | 5–1 | T–1st | |
| 1984 | Minot State | 6–2–1 | 4–2 | T–3rd | |
| 1985 | Minot State | 7–1–1 | 5–0 | 1st | |
| 1986 | Minot State | 5–4 | 3–2 | 3rd | |
| 1987 | Minot State | 6–3 | 3–2 | 3rd | |
| 1988 | Minot State | 6–3 | 4–2 | 3rd | |
| 1989 | Minot State | 4–5 | 3–2 | 3rd | |
| Minot State: | | 45–24–2 | 30–14 | | |
St. Cloud State Huskies (North Central Conference) (1999–2007)
| 1999 | St. Cloud State | 3–8 | 1–8 | 10th | |
| 2000 | St. Cloud State | 1–9 | 1–8 | 9th | |
| 2001 | St. Cloud State | 4–7 | 3–5 | 7th | |
| 2002 | St. Cloud State | 9–2 | 6–2 | 2nd | |
| 2003 | St. Cloud State | 7–4 | 4–3 | T–4th | |
| 2004 | St. Cloud State | 8–3 | 4–2 | T–2nd | L NCAA Division II First Round |
| 2005 | St. Cloud State | 8–3 | 3–3 | 5th | |
| 2006 | St. Cloud State | 3–8 | 1–7 | 9th | |
| 2007 | St. Cloud State | 4–7 | 1–7 | T–8th | |
| St. Cloud State: | | 47–51 | 24–45 | | |
| Total: | | 92–75–2 | | | |
National championship Conference title Conference division title or championship game berth
