= Eric Torkelson =

American football player (born 1952)

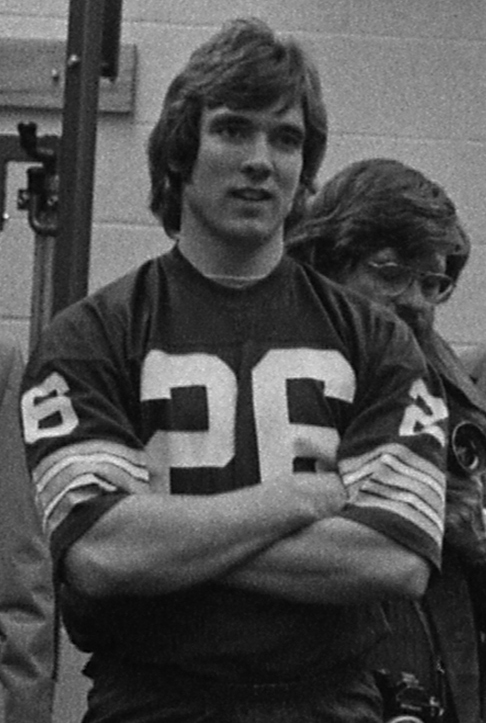
- Torkelson in 1976

No. 26
- Position: Running back

Personal information
- Born: March 3, 1952 (age 74); Troy, New York, U.S.
- Listed height: 6 ft 2 in (1.88 m)
- Listed weight: 194 lb (88 kg)

Career information
- High school: Burnt Hills-Ballston Lake (Burnt Hills, New York)
- College: Connecticut
- NFL draft: 1974: 11th round, 272nd overall pick

Career history
- Green Bay Packers (1974–1981)

Career NFL statistics
- Rushing attempts: 351
- Rushing yards: 1,307
- Rushing touchdowns: 8
- Stats at Pro Football Reference

Eric Grove Torkelson (born March 3, 1952) is an American former professional football player who was a running back for seven seasons with the Green Bay Packers of the National Football League (NFL) from (1974–1979 and 1981).

He was the first football player from Burnt Hills-Ballston Lake High School to reach the NFL.
