= Gary Huff =

American football player and coach (born 1951)

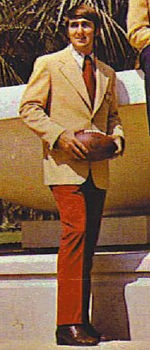
- Huff in 1972

No. 19
- Position: Quarterback

Personal information
- Born: April 27, 1951 (age 75); Natchez, Mississippi, U.S.
- Listed height: 6 ft 1 in (1.85 m)
- Listed weight: 195 lb (88 kg)

Career information
- High school: Leto
- College: Florida State
- NFL draft: 1973: 2nd round, 33rd overall pick

Career history

Playing
- Chicago Bears (1973–1976); Tampa Bay Buccaneers (1977–1978); San Francisco 49ers (1980); Memphis Showboats (1985)

Coaching
- Indiana (1983) Offensive coordinator; Memphis Showboats (1984–1985) Passing coordinator; Houston Oilers (1986) Quarterbacks coach; Kansas (1987) Offensive coordinator; Los Angeles Raiders (1987–1993) CFO

Awards and highlights
- First-team All-American (1972); NCAA passing yards leader (1971)

Career NFL statistics
- Passing attempts: 788
- Passing completions: 392
- Completion percentage: 49.7%
- TD–INT: 16–50
- Passing yards: 4,329
- Passer rating: 46.8
- Stats at Pro Football Reference

Gary Earl Huff (born April 27, 1951) is an American former professional football player who was a quarterback in the National Football League (NFL). He graduated from Leto Senior High School in Tampa, Florida and played college football and baseball at Florida State University before becoming a professional football player and coach. Huff's jersey number while playing football for Florida State University was "19."

He was an All-American at FSU, leading the nation in touchdown passes in 1971 and 1972. Huff played in the first annual Fiesta Bowl in 1971, passed for three touchdowns, and for the first time in college history had three receivers catch over 100 yards in the same game (Barry Smith 8 for 143 yards, Rhett Dawson 8 for 108 yards, and Kent Gaydos 5 for 101 yards).

Huff was drafted with the 7th pick in the second round (33rd pick overall) by the Chicago Bears in the 1973 NFL draft. He played with the Bears for four years (1973–1976), two years with Tampa Bay Buccaneers (1977–1978), and one year with the San Francisco 49ers (1980).

He quarterbacked the first win in Buccaneers history in 1977. He finished his 13-year playing career in 1985 as a player-coach for the USFL Memphis Showboats.

== Business career ==
During the NFL offseasons, Huff worked as a certified public accountant with local and national CPA firms in Tampa, Florida, before going into coaching. His coaching career included Indiana University (1983) as offensive coordinator, the Memphis Showboats (1984–1985) as passing coordinator, the Houston Oilers (1986) as quarterbacks coach, and the University of Kansas (1987) as offensive coordinator. In 1987, he became the CFO of the Los Angeles Raiders, where he served for six years (1987–1993). He was one of only three people during that time to have played, coached, and worked in administration in professional football. (Jim Finks and George Young were the other two.)

Huff left football for a position with cellular telephone company C Spire, formerly Cellular South, in Ridgeland, MS as VP of Operations for eight years (1993–2001) and also worked as the CFO for the largest IBMinternational reseller in the world for four years (2002–2005).

Huff currently is the senior associate athletic director at Florida State University where he was the first Academic Football All-America in school history.

== See also ==
- List of NCAA major college football yearly passing leaders
- List of NCAA major college football yearly total offense leaders
