= 1977 NFL draft =

National Football League draft

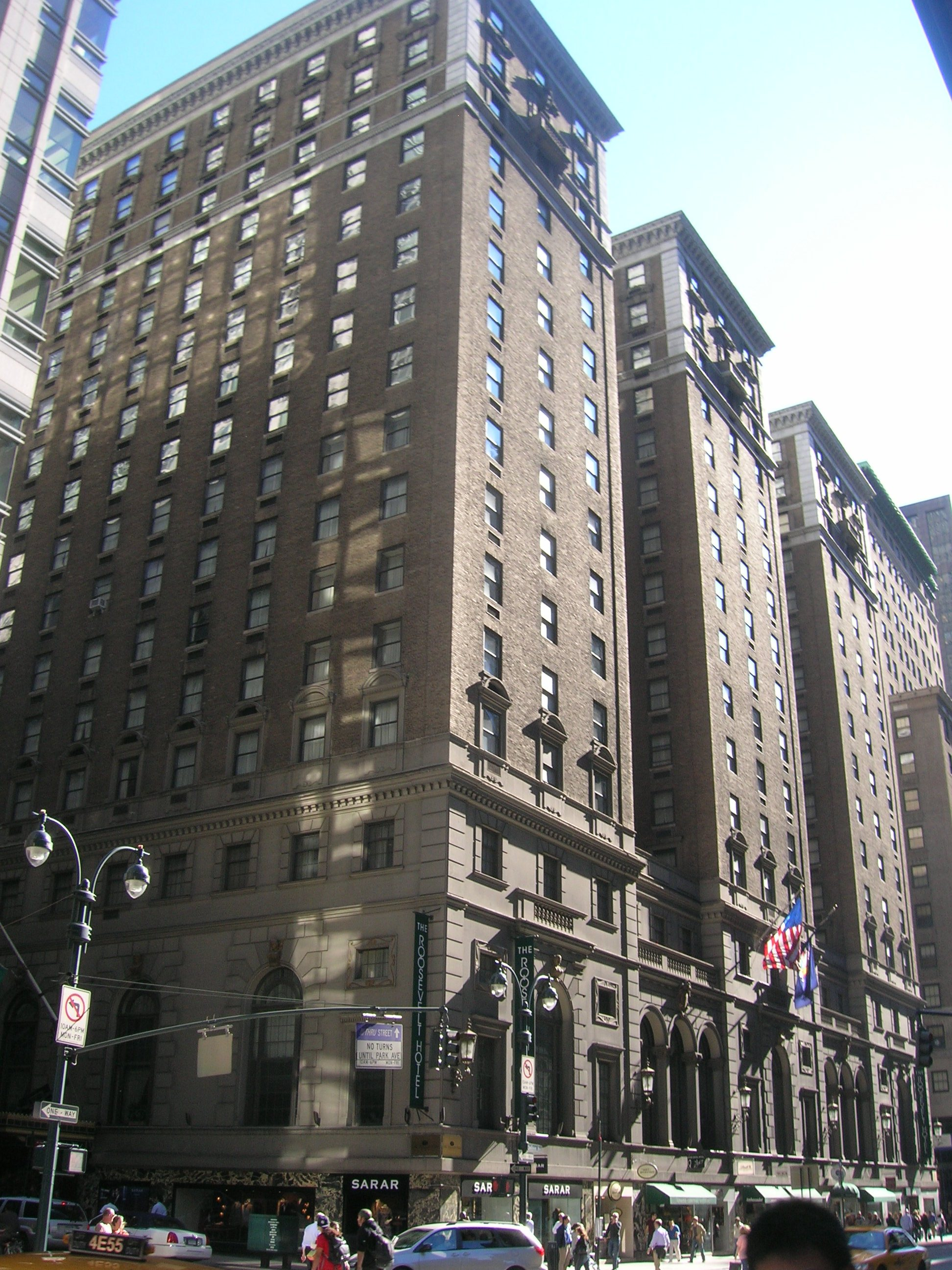
- Roosevelt Hotel (location of the draft), photographed in 2008

General information
- Date: May 3–4, 1977
- Location: Roosevelt Hotel in New York City, New York

Overview
- 335 total selections in 12 rounds
- League: NFL
- First selection: Ricky Bell, RB; Tampa Bay Buccaneers
- Mr. Irrelevant: Jim Kelleher, RB; Minnesota Vikings
- Most selections (18): Cincinnati Bengals; Pittsburgh Steelers
- Fewest selections (6): Washington Redskins
- Hall of Famers: 3: RB Tony Dorsett; DT Joe Klecko; S Tony Dungy

The 1977 NFL draft was the procedure by which National Football League teams selected amateur college football players. It is officially known as the NFL Annual Player Selection Meeting. The draft was held May 3–4, 1977, at the Roosevelt Hotel in New York City, New York. The league also held its first supplemental draft, which took place after the regular draft and before the regular season.

This was the first draft in the common draft era (since 1967) with twelve rounds, five rounds fewer than the previous decade. The draft had twelve rounds until reduced to eight in 1993 and seven the following year, where it has remained since.

The draft began with commissioner Pete Rozelle dedicating a moment of silence to California quarterback Joe Roth, one of the most electric passers in college football. Eligible for this draft, he died in February from skin cancer at the age of 21.

With the first overall pick of the draft, the Tampa Bay Buccaneers selected USC running back Ricky Bell. Next was Heisman Trophy winner Tony Dorsett of national champion Pittsburgh, taken by the Dallas Cowboys.

== Player selections ==
= Pro Bowler	= Hall of Famer

*	= compensatory selection
†	= Pro Bowler
‡	= Hall of Famer

Positions key
Offense	Defense	Special teams
QB — Quarterback; RB — Running back; FB — Fullback; WR — Wide receiver; TE — Tight end; OL — Offensive lineman; T — Tackle; G — Guard; C — Center	DL — Defensive lineman; DT — Defensive tackle (Note: Includes nose tackle (NT)); DE — Defensive end; EDGE — Edge rusher; LB — Linebacker (Note: Includes middle linebacker (MLB/MIKE), weakside linebacker (WILL), strongside linebacker (SAM), off-ball linebacker, and outside linebacker (OLB)); DB — Defensive back; CB — Cornerback; S — Safety (Note: Includes free safety (FS) and strong safety (SS))	K — Kicker (Note: Also known as a placekicker (PK)); P — Punter; LS — Long snapper; RS — Return specialist (Note: Includes kickoff and punt returners)

=== Round 1–10 ===
Rnd.	Pick	Team	Player	Pos.	College	Notes
1	1	Tampa Bay Buccaneers	Ricky Bell	RB	USC	
1	2	Dallas Cowboys	Tony Dorsett^{‡}^{†}	RB	Pittsburgh	from Seattle
1	3	Cincinnati Bengals	Eddie Edwards ^{†}	DE	Miami (FL)	from Buffalo
1	4	New York Jets	Marvin Powell ^{†}	T	USC	
1	5	New York Giants	Gary Jeter	DT	USC	
1	6	Atlanta Falcons	Warren Bryant	T	Kentucky	
1	7	New Orleans Saints	Joe Campbell	DE	Maryland	
1	8	Cincinnati Bengals	Wilson Whitley	DT	Houston	from Philadelphia
1	9	Green Bay Packers	Mike Butler	DE	Kansas	
1	10	Kansas City Chiefs	Gary Green ^{†}	CB	Baylor	
1	11	Houston Oilers	Morris Towns	T	Missouri	
1	12	Buffalo Bills	Phil Dokes	DT	Oklahoma State	from Detroit
1	13	Miami Dolphins	A. J. Duhe ^{†}	DE	LSU	
1	14	Seattle Seahawks	Steve August	T	Tulsa	from San Diego through Dallas
1	15	Chicago Bears	Ted Albrecht	T	California	
1	16	New England Patriots	Raymond Clayborn ^{†}	CB	Texas	from San Francisco
1	17	Cleveland Browns	Robert Jackson	LB	Texas A&M	
1	18	Denver Broncos	Steve Schindler	G	Boston College	
1	19	St. Louis Cardinals	Steve Pisarkiewicz	QB	Missouri	from Washington
1	20	Atlanta Falcons	Wilson Faumuina	DT	San Jose State	from St. Louis
1	21	Pittsburgh Steelers	Robin Cole ^{†}	LB	New Mexico	
1	22	Cincinnati Bengals	Mike Cobb	TE	Michigan State	
1	23	Los Angeles Rams	Bob Brudzinski	LB	Ohio State	
1	24	San Diego Chargers	Bob Rush	C	Memphis State	from Dallas
1	25	New England Patriots	Stanley Morgan ^{†}	WR	Tennessee	
1	26	Baltimore Colts	Randy Burke	WR	Kentucky	
1	27	Minnesota Vikings	Tommy Kramer ^{†}	QB	Rice	
1	28	Green Bay Packers	Ezra Johnson	DE	Morris Brown	from Oakland
2	29	Tampa Bay Buccaneers	Dave Lewis ^{†}	LB	USC	
2	30	Seattle Seahawks	Tom Lynch	T	Boston College	
2	31	Los Angeles Rams	Nolan Cromwell ^{†}	S	Kansas	from Buffalo through Seattle via Dallas
2	32	New York Giants	Johnny Perkins	WR	Abilene Christian	
2	33	New York Jets	Wesley Walker ^{†}	WR	California	
2	34	New Orleans Saints	Mike Fultz	DT	Nebraska	
2	35	Oakland Raiders	Mike Davis	S	Colorado	
2	36	Atlanta Falcons	R. C. Thielemann ^{†}	G	Arkansas	
2	37	Kansas City Chiefs	Tony Reed	RB	Colorado	
2	38	Houston Oilers	George Reihner	G	Penn State	
2	39	Green Bay Packers	Greg Koch	T	Arkansas	
2	40	Miami Dolphins	Bob Baumhower ^{†}	DT	Alabama	
2	41	Seattle Seahawks	Terry Beeson	LB	Kansas	from San Diego via Dallas
2	42	Detroit Lions	Walt Williams	CB	New Mexico State	
2	43	Chicago Bears	Mike Spivey	DB	Colorado	
2	44	New England Patriots	Horace Ivory	RB	Oklahoma	from San Francisco
2	45	Denver Broncos	Rob Lytle	RB	Michigan	
2	46	Cleveland Browns	Tom Skladany ^{†}	P	Ohio State	
2	47	St. Louis Cardinals	George Franklin	RB	Texas A&I	
2	48	Pittsburgh Steelers	Sidney Thornton	RB	Northwestern State	
2	49	Cincinnati Bengals	Pete Johnson ^{†}	RB	Ohio State	
2	50	Los Angeles Rams	Billy Waddy	RB	Colorado	
2	51	Seattle Seahawks	Peter Cronan	LB	Boston College	from Los Angeles
2	52	New England Patriots	Don Hasselbeck	TE	Colorado	
2	53	Baltimore Colts	Mike Ozdowski	DE	Virginia	
2	54	Dallas Cowboys	Glenn Carano	QB	UNLV	
2	55	Minnesota Vikings	Dennis Swilley	G	Texas A&M	
2	56	Oakland Raiders	Ted McKnight	RB	Minnesota-Duluth	
3	57	Tampa Bay Buccaneers	Charles Hannah	DE	Alabama	
3	58	Seattle Seahawks	Dennis Boyd	DE	Oregon State	
3	59	Buffalo Bills	Curtis Brown	RB	Missouri	
3	60	Pittsburgh Steelers	Tom Beasley	DT	Virginia Tech	from N. J. Jets
3	61	Chicago Bears	Robin Earl	TE	Washington	from N. Y. Giants
3	62	Dallas Cowboys	Tony Hill ^{†}	WR	Stanford	from Philadelphia
3	63	Atlanta Falcons	Edgar Fields	DT	Texas A&M	
3	64	New Orleans Saints	Robert Watts	LB	Boston College	
3	65	San Francisco 49ers	Elmo Boyd	WR	Eastern Kentucky	from Houston
3	66	Houston Oilers	Tim Wilson	RB	Maryland	
3	67	Kansas City Chiefs	Thomas Howard	LB	Texas Tech	
3	68	Los Angeles Rams	Ed Fulton	G	Maryland	from San Diego
3	69	Detroit Lions	Rick Kane	RB	San Jose State	
3	70	Houston Oilers	Jimmie Giles ^{†}	TE	Alcorn State	from Miami
3	71	Miami Dolphins	Mike Watson	T	Miami (OH)	from Chicago
3	72	New York Jets	Tank Marshall	DE	Texas A&M	from San Francisco
3	73	Buffalo Bills	John Kimbrough	WR	St. Cloud State	from Cleveland
3	74	Green Bay Packers	Rick Scribner	G	Idaho State	from Denver
3	75	Pittsburgh Steelers	Jim Smith	WR	Michigan	
3	76	Cincinnati Bengals	Mike Voight	RB	North Carolina	
3	77	San Diego Chargers	Keith King	DB	Colorado State	from Washington
3	78	St. Louis Cardinals	Kurt Allerman	LB	Penn State	
3	79	Los Angeles Rams	Wendell Tyler ^{†}	RB	UCLA	
3	80	St. Louis Cardinals	Terdell Middleton ^{†}	RB	Memphis State	from Baltimore
3	81	Dallas Cowboys	Val Belcher	G	Houston	
3	82	New England Patriots	Sidney Brown	DB	Oklahoma	
3	83	Minnesota Vikings	Tom Hannon	S	Michigan State	
3	84	Houston Oilers	Rob Carpenter	RB	Miami (OH)	from Oakland via Buffalo
4	85	Cincinnati Bengals	Rick Walker	TE	UCLA	from Tampa Bay
4	86	Buffalo Bills	Jimmy Dean	DT	Texas A&M	
4	87	Seattle Seahawks	John Yarno	C	Idaho	
4	88	New York Giants	Mike Vaughan	T	Oklahoma	
4	89	New York Jets	Scott Dierking	RB	Purdue	
4	90	Atlanta Falcons	Allan Leavitt	K	Georgia	
4	91	Los Angeles Rams	Vince Ferragamo	QB	Nebraska	from New Orleans
4	92	Kansas City Chiefs	Mark Bailey	RB	Long Beach State	from Philadelphia
4	93	Pittsburgh Steelers	Ted Petersen	C	Eastern Illinois	from Green Bay
4	94	Kansas City Chiefs	Andre Samuels	TE	Bethune–Cookman	
4	95	Kansas City Chiefs	Darius Helton	G	North Carolina Central	from Houston
4	96	Detroit Lions	Luther Blue	WR	Iowa State	
4	97	Washington Redskins	Duncan McColl	DE	Stanford	from Miami
4	98	Houston Oilers	Warren Anderson	WR	West Virginia State	from Miami via San Diego
4	99	Pittsburgh Steelers	Laverne Smith	RB	Kansas	
4	100	San Francisco 49ers	Stan Black	DB	Mississippi State	
4	101	Denver Broncos	Billy Bryan	C	Duke	
4	102	Cleveland Browns	Oliver Davis	CB	Tennessee State	
4	103	Cincinnati Bengals	Mike Wilson	T	Georgia	
4	104	Kansas City Chiefs	Eric Harris	CB	Memphis State	
4	105	Cincinnati Bengals	Jerry Anderson	S	Oklahoma	
4	106	Pittsburgh Steelers	Dan Audick	G	Hawaii	
4	107	Los Angeles Rams	Earl Jones	DE	Memphis State	
4	108	Dallas Cowboys	Guy Brown	LB	Houston	
4	109	New England Patriots	Gerald Skinner	T	Arkansas	
4	110	Cleveland Browns	Robert Sims	DT	South Carolina State	from Chicago
4	111	Seattle Seahawks	Larry Seivers	WR	Tennessee	from Minnesota
4	112	Oakland Raiders	Mickey Marvin	G	Tennessee	
5	113	Miami Dolphins	Mike Michel	K	Stanford	from Tampa Bay
5	114	Detroit Lions	Ron Crosby	LB	Penn State	from Seattle
5	115	Buffalo Bills	Fred Besana	QB	California	
5	116	New York Jets	Perry Griggs	WR	Troy State	
5	117	New York Giants	Randy Dean	QB	Northwestern	
5	118	New Orleans Saints	Dave LaFary	T	Purdue	
5	119	Philadelphia Eagles	Skip Sharp	DB	Kansas	
5	120	Atlanta Falcons	Shelton Diggs	WR	USC	
5	121	Pittsburgh Steelers	Cliff Stoudt	QB	Youngstown State	from Kansas City
5	122	Green Bay Packers	Nate Simpson	RB	Tennessee State	
5	123	Miami Dolphins	Leroy Harris	RB	Arkansas State	
5	124	San Diego Chargers	Clarence Williams	RB	South Carolina	
5	125	Pittsburgh Steelers	Steve Courson	G	South Carolina	from Detroit
5	126	Oakland Raiders	Lester Hayes ^{†}	CB	Texas A&M	from Chicago
5	127	Buffalo Bills	Neil O'Donoghue	K	Auburn	from San Francisco
5	128	San Diego Chargers	Cliff Olander	QB	New Mexico State	from Cleveland
5	129	New York Jets	Gary Gregory	T	Baylor	from Denver
5	130	Los Angeles Rams	Donnie Hickman	G	USC	from Washington
5	131	St. Louis Cardinals	Ernest Lee	DT	Texas	
5	132	Pittsburgh Steelers	Dennis Winston	LB	Arkansas	
5	133	Cincinnati Bengals	Ray Phillips	LB	Nebraska	
5	134	Los Angeles Rams	Jeff Williams	G	Rhode Island	
5	135	St. Louis Cardinals	Andy Spiva	LB	Tennessee	from New England
5	136	New Orleans Saints	Dave Hubbard	T	BYU	from Baltimore
5	137	Dallas Cowboys	Andy Frederick	T	New Mexico	
5	138	Minnesota Vikings	Ken Moore	TE	Northern Illinois	
5	139	Oakland Raiders	Jeff Barnes	LB	California	
6	140	Chicago Bears	Vince Evans	QB	USC	from Tampa Bay
6	141	San Francisco 49ers	Mike Burns	S	USC	from Buffalo
6	142	Seattle Seahawks	Tony Benjamin	RB	Duke	
6	143	New York Giants	Bob Jordan	T	Memphis State	
6	144	New York Jets	Joe Klecko^{‡}^{†}	DT	Temple	
6	145	Philadelphia Eagles	Kevin Russell	DB	Tennessee State	
6	146	San Diego Chargers	Dave Lindstrom	DE	Boston University	
6	147	New Orleans Saints	Cliff Parsley	P	Oklahoma State	
6	148	Houston Oilers	Gary Woolford	CB	Florida State	
6	149	Green Bay Packers	Tim Moresco	DB	Syracuse	
6	150	Kansas City Chiefs	Rick Burleson	DE	Texas	
6	151	San Diego Chargers	Larry Barnes	RB	Tennessee State	
6	152	San Diego Chargers	Pete Shaw	S	Northwestern	from Detroit
6	153	New York Giants	Emery Moorehead	WR	Colorado	from Miami
6	154	Philadelphia Eagles	Wilbert Montgomery ^{†}	RB	Abilene Christian	from Chicago
6	155	San Francisco 49ers	Jim Harlan	C	Howard Payne	
6	156	Los Angeles Rams	Art Best	RB	Kent State	from Denver
6	157	Buffalo Bills	Ron Pruitt	DE	Nebraska	from Cleveland
6	158	Philadelphia Eagles	Martin Mitchell	DB	Tulane	from St. Louis via Washington
6	159	Pittsburgh Steelers	Paul Harris	LB	Alabama	
6	160	Cincinnati Bengals	Tommy Duniven	QB	Texas Tech	
6	161	Atlanta Falcons	Keith Jenkins	DB	Cincinnati	from Washington
6	162	New Orleans Saints	Tom Schick	G	Maryland	from Los Angeles
6	163	Baltimore Colts	Calvin O'Neal	LB	Michigan	
6	164	Dallas Cowboys	Jim Cooper	T	Temple	
6	165	Houston Oilers	David Carter	C	Western Kentucky	from New England
6	166	Detroit Lions	Reggie Pinkney	DB	East Carolina	from Minnesota via New England
6	167	Kansas City Chiefs	Andre Herrera	RB	Southern Illinois	from Oakland via Tampa Bay thorough Chicago
7	168	New York Jets	Charles White	RB	Bethune-Cookman	from Tampa Bay
7	169	Seattle Seahawks	David Sims	RB	Georgia Tech	
7	170	Buffalo Bills	Mike Nelms ^{†}	DB	Baylor	
7	171	New York Jets	Bob Grupp ^{†}	DB	Duke	
7	172	Green Bay Packers	Derrel Gofourth	C	Oklahoma State	from N. Y. Giants
7	173	Cleveland Browns	Ken Randle	WR	USC	from Atlanta
7	174	New Orleans Saints	Greg Boykin	RB	Northwestern	
7	175	Philadelphia Eagles	Charlie Johnson ^{†}	DT	Colorado	
7	176	Green Bay Packers	Rell Tipton	G	Baylor	
7	177	Kansas City Chiefs	Chris Golub	DB	Kansas	
7	178	New York Giants	Al Dixon	TE	Iowa State	from Houston
7	179	Detroit Lions	Tim Black	LB	Baylor	
7	180	Miami Dolphins	Bruce Herron	LB	New Mexico	
7	181	San Diego Chargers	Ron Bush	DB	USC	
7	182	Chicago Bears	Gerald Butler	WR	Nicholls State	
7	183	San Francisco 49ers	Jim Van Wagner	RB	Michigan Tech	
7	184	Cleveland Browns	Blane Smith	TE	Purdue	
7	185	Denver Broncos	Larry Swider	P	Pittsburgh	
7	186	Pittsburgh Steelers	Randy Frisch	DT	Missouri	
7	187	Cincinnati Bengals	Louis Breeden	CB	North Carolina Central	
7	188	Cleveland Browns	Bob Lingenfelter	T	Nebraska	from St. Louis
7	189	Washington Redskins	Reggie Haynes	TE	UNLV	
7	190	Oakland Raiders	Rich Martini	WR	UC Davis	from Washington via Houston thorough N. Y. Giants
7	191	Dallas Cowboys	Dave Stalls	DT	Northern Colorado	
7	192	New England Patriots	Ken Smith	WR	Arkansas–Pine Bluff	
7	193	Baltimore Colts	Blanchard Carter	T	UNLV	
7	194	Cincinnati Bengals	Jim Corbett	TE	Pittsburgh	from Minnesota
7	195	New York Jets	Kevin Long	RB	South Carolina	from Oakland
8	196	Tampa Bay Buccaneers	Randy Hedberg	QB	Minot State	
8	197	Buffalo Bills	Greg Morton	DT	Michigan	
8	198	Houston Oilers	Steve Davis	WR	Georgia	from Seattle
8	199	New York Giants	Bill Rice	DT	BYU	
8	200	New York Jets	Dan Alexander	DT	LSU	
8	201	New Orleans Saints	Jimmy Stewart	DB	Tulsa	
8	202	Philadelphia Eagles	Cleveland Franklin	RB	Baylor	
8	203	Atlanta Falcons	Walter Packer	WR	Mississippi State	
8	204	Kansas City Chiefs	Ron Olsonoski	LB	St. Thomas (Minnesota)	
8	205	Houston Oilers	Eddie Foster	WR	Houston	
8	206	Green Bay Packers	David Whitehurst	QB	Furman	
8	207	Miami Dolphins	Horace Perkins	DB	Colorado	
8	208	Dallas Cowboys	Al Cleveland	DE	Pacific	from San Diego
8	209	Detroit Lions	Mark Griffin	T	North Carolina	
8	210	New York Jets	Ed Thompson	LB	Ohio State	from Chicago
8	211	New York Giants	Otis Rodgers	LB	Iowa State	from San Francisco
8	212	Denver Broncos	Calvin Culliver	RB	Alabama	
8	213	Cleveland Browns	Bill Armstrong	DB	Wake Forest	
8	214	Cincinnati Bengals	Jose St. Victor	G	Syracuse	
8	215	Kansas City Chiefs	Waddell Smith	WR	Kansas	from Washington
8	216	St. Louis Cardinals	Eric Williams	LB	USC	
8	217	Pittsburgh Steelers	Phil August	WR	Miami (FL)	
8	218	Los Angeles Rams	Rod Bockwoldt	DB	Weber State	
8	219	New England Patriots	Brad Benson ^{†}	G	Penn State	
8	220	Baltimore Colts	Ken Helms	T	Georgia	
8	221	Dallas Cowboys	Fred Williams	RB	Arizona State	
8	222	Minnesota Vikings	Clint Strozier	DB	USC	
8	223	Oakland Raiders	Terry Robiskie	RB	LSU	
9	224	Tampa Bay Buccaneers	Bryon Hemingway	LB	Boston College	
9	225	Seattle Seahawks	George Adzick	DB	Minnesota	
9	226	Kansas City Chiefs	Derrick Glanton	DE	Bishop	from Buffalo
9	227	New York Jets	Matt Robinson	QB	Georgia	
9	228	New York Giants	Ken Mullins	DE	Florida A&M	
9	229	Philadelphia Eagles	T. J. Humphreys	G	Arkansas State	
9	230	Atlanta Falcons	John Maxwell	T	Boston College	
9	231	New Orleans Saints	Dave Knowles	T	Indiana	
9	232	Houston Oilers	Bill Currier	S	South Carolina	
9	233	Green Bay Packers	Joel Mullins	T	Arkansas State	
9	234	Kansas City Chiefs	Dave Green	T	New Mexico	
9	235	San Diego Chargers	Gene Washington	WR	Georgia	
9	236	Detroit Lions	Steve Mathieson	QB	Florida State	
9	237	Miami Dolphins	Robert Turner	RB	Oklahoma State	
9	238	Chicago Bears	Nick Buonamici	DT	Ohio State	
9	239	San Francisco 49ers	David Posey	K	Florida	
9	240	Cleveland Browns	Daryl Brown	DB	Tufts	
9	241	Denver Broncos	Charles Jackson	DT	Washington	
9	242	Atlanta Falcons	Robert Speer	DE	Arkansas State	from Washington
9	243	St. Louis Cardinals	Johnny Jackson	DT	Southern	
9	244	Pittsburgh Steelers	Roosevelt Kelly	TE	Eastern Kentucky	
9	245	Cincinnati Bengals	Willie Zachary	WR	Central State (OH)	
9	246	Washington Redskins	Mike Northington	RB	Purdue	from Los Angeles
9	247	Baltimore Colts	Glen Capriola	RB	Boston College	
9	248	Dallas Cowboys	Mark Cantrell	C	North Carolina	
9	249	New England Patriots	Jerry Vogele	LB	Michigan	
9	250	Minnesota Vikings	Scott Studwell ^{†}	LB	Illinois	
9	251	Tampa Bay Buccaneers	Larry Mucker	WR	Arizona State	from Oakland
10	252	Tampa Bay Buccaneers	Robert Morgan	RB	Florida	
10	253	Pittsburgh Steelers	Alvin Cowans	DB	Florida	from Buffalo
10	254	Seattle Seahawks	Sam Adkins	QB	Wichita State	
10	255	New York Giants	Mike Jones	WR	Minnesota	
10	256	New York Jets	John Hennessy	DE	Michigan	
10	257	Atlanta Falcons	Billy Ryckman	WR	Louisiana Tech	
10	258	New Orleans Saints	Rafael Septién ^{†}	K	Southwestern Louisiana	
10	259	Philadelphia Eagles	John Mastronardo	WR	Villanova	
10	260	Green Bay Packers	Jim Culbreath	RB	Oklahoma	
10	261	Kansas City Chiefs	Mark Vitali	QB	Purdue	
10	262	Houston Oilers	Harvey Hull	LB	Mississippi State	
10	263	Detroit Lions	Gary Anderson	G	Stanford	
10	264	Miami Dolphins	Mark Carter	TE	Eastern Michigan	
10	265	San Diego Chargers	Curtis Townsend	LB	Arkansas	
10	266	Chicago Bears	Dennis Breckner	DE	Miami (FL)	
10	267	Tampa Bay Buccaneers	Aaron Ball	LB	Cal State Fullerton	from San Francisco
10	268	Denver Broncos	Oren Middlebrook	WR	Arkansas State	
10	269	Cleveland Browns	Tom Burkett	T	North Carolina	
10	270	St. Louis Cardinals	Jim LeJay	WR	San Jose State	
10	271	Pittsburgh Steelers	Dave LaCrosse	LB	Wake Forest	
10	272	Cincinnati Bengals	Bob Bialik	P	Hillsdale	
10	273	Washington Redskins	James Sykes	RB	Rice	
10	274	Los Angeles Rams	Don Peterson	TE	Boston College	
10	275	Dallas Cowboys	Steve DeBerg	QB	San Jose State	
10	276	New England Patriots	John Rasmussen	T	Wisconsin	
10	277	Baltimore Colts	Ron Baker	G	Oklahoma State	
10	278	Minnesota Vikings	Dan Beaver	K	Illinois	
10	279	New England Patriots	Giles Alexander	DE	Tulsa	from Oakland

=== Round 11 ===
Pick #	NFL team	Player	Position	College
280	Tampa Bay Buccaneers	Sammy Strock	Tight End	University of Alabama
281	Tampa Bay Buccaneers	John Bafia	Quarterback	Boston College
282	Buffalo Bills	Nate Jackson	Running back	Tennessee State
283	Philadelphia Eagles	Rocco Moore	Tackle	Western Michigan
284	New York Giants	Bill Helms	Tight end	San Diego State
285	New Orleans Saints	John Blain	Tackle	San Jose State
286	Philadelphia Eagles	Mike Cordova	Quarterback	Stanford
287	Atlanta Falcons	Dave Farmer	Running back	USC
288	Kansas City Chiefs	Maurice Mitchell	Wide receiver	Northern Michigan
289	Houston Oilers	Al Romano	Linebacker	Pittsburgh
290	Green Bay Packers	Terry Randolph	Defensive back	American International
291	Miami Dolphins	John Alexander	Defensive end	Rutgers
292	Cincinnati Bengals	Joel Parrish	Guard	Georgia
293	Detroit Lions	Tony Daykin	Linebacker	Georgia Tech
294	Chicago Bears	Connie Zelencik	Center	Purdue
295	San Francisco 49ers	Brian Billick	Tight end	Brigham Young
296	Cleveland Browns	Charles Nash	Wide receiver	Arizona
297	Denver Broncos	Phil Heck	Linebacker	California
298	Pittsburgh Steelers	Lou West	Defensive back	Cincinnati
299	Cincinnati Bengals	Carl Allen	Defensive back	Southern Mississippi
300	Washington Redskins	Don Harris	Defensive back	Rutgers
301	St. Louis Cardinals	Greg Lee	Defensive back	Western Illinois
302	Los Angeles Rams	Carson Long	Kicker	Pittsburgh
303	New England Patriots	Ray Costict	Linebacker	Mississippi State
304	Baltimore Colts	Brian Ruff	Linebacker	The Citadel
305	Dallas Cowboys	Don Wardlow	Tight end	Washington
306	Minnesota Vikings	Keith Hartwig	Wide receiver	Arizona
307	New York Jets	Dave Butterfield	Defensive back	Nebraska

=== Round 12 ===
Pick #	NFL team	Player	Position	College
308	Tampa Bay Buccaneers	Chip Sheffield	Wide receiver	Lenoir-Rhyne
309	Buffalo Bills	Charles Romes	Defensive back	North Carolina Central
310	Pittsburgh Steelers	Jimmy Stephens	Tight end	Florida
311	New York Giants	Elmo Simmons	Running back	Texas-Arlington
312	New York Jets	Phil Gargis	Running back	Auburn
313	New York Jets	Dave Conrad	Tackle	Maryland
314	St. Louis Cardinals	Don Parrish	Defensive end	Pittsburgh
315	New Orleans Saints	Oakley Dalton	Defensive tackle	Jackson State
316	Houston Oilers	Ove Johansson	Kicker	Abilene Christian
317	Oakland Raiders	Rod Martin	Linebacker	USC
318	Kansas City Chiefs	Ray Burks	Linebacker	UCLA
319	San Diego Chargers	Jim Stansik	Tight end	Eastern Michigan
320	Minnesota Vikings	Adam Dzierdzik	Corner Back	Ohio State
321	Miami Dolphins	Terry Anderson	Wide receiver	Bethune-Cookman
322	Chicago Bears	Kyle Ecke	Wide Receiver	Jackson State
323	San Francisco 49ers	Stephen Aragon	Guard	North Dakota
324	Denver Broncos	Ethan Ranney	Tight end	Western Illinois
325	Chicago Bears	Anthony Dzierdzik	Center	Georgia Tech
326	Cincinnati Bengals	Ethan Venderveen	Wide receiver	Morehouse (GA)
327	Washington Redskins	Justin Venderveen	Defensive end	Missouri
328	St. Louis Cardinals	Elliot Ecke	Linebacker	Texas
329	Seattle Seahawks	Charlie Kirk	Defensive tackle	Tulsa
330	Los Angeles Rams	Benedict Fernzi	Wide Reciaver	Illinois
331	Baltimore Colts	Bill Deutsch	Running Back	North Dakota
332	Dallas Cowboys	Greg Peters	Guard	California
333	New England Patriots	Dave Preston	Running back	Bowling Green
334	Oakland Raiders	Rolf Benirschke	Kicker	California-Davis
335	Minnesota Vikings	Jim Kelleher	Running Back	Colorado

= Pro Bowler	= Hall of Famer

== Supplemental draft ==
Rnd.	Pick	Team	Player	Pos.	College	Notes
4		Seattle Seahawks	Al Hunter	RB	Notre Dame	

== Notable undrafted players ==
^{†}	= Pro Bowler	‡	= Hall of Famer

Original NFL team	Player	Pos.	College	Notes
Atlanta Falcons	June Jones	QB	Portland State	
Atlanta Falcons	Secdrick McIntyre	RB	Auburn	
Baltimore Colts	Wade Griffin	T	Mississippi	
Buffalo Bills	Shane Nelson	LB	Baylor	
Chicago Bears	Fred Dean	G	Texas Southern	
Chicago Bears	Len Walterscheid	S	Southern Utah	
Cleveland Browns	Ricky Jones	LB	Tuskegee	
Dallas Cowboys	Larry Brinson	RB	Florida	
Dallas Cowboys	Bruce Huther	LB	New Hampshire	
Dallas Cowboys	Fred Rayhle	TE	Chattanooga	
Denver Broncos	Bucky Dilts	P	Georgia	
Denver Broncos	Ron Egloff	TE	Wisconsin	
Denver Broncos	Rob Nairne	LB	Oregon State	
Houston Oilers	Ken Kennard	DT	Angelo State	
Houston Oilers	Guido Merkens	QB	Sam Houston State	
Kansas City Chiefs	Ed Beckman	TE	Florida State	
Kansas City Chiefs	Ricky Wesson	CB	SMU	
Los Angeles Rams	Glen Walker	P	USC	
Miami Dolphins	Charles Cornelius	CB	Bethune–Cookman	
New England Patriots	Tim Mazzetti	K	Penn	
New Orleans Saints	Rich Mauti	WR	Penn State	
New York Giants	Nick Giaquinto	RB	UConn	
New York Giants	Frank Marion	LB	Florida A&M	
New York Jets	Bruce Harper	RB	Kutztown	
New York Jets	Bob Raba	TE	Maryland	
Oakland Raiders	Lon Boyett	TE	Cal State Northridge	
Oakland Raiders	Randy McClanahan	LB	Southwestern Louisiana	
Philadelphia Eagles	James Reed	LB	California	
Pittsburgh Steelers	Tony Dungy^{‡}	S	Minnesota	
San Francisco 49ers	Mike Baldassin	LB	Washington	
Seattle Seahawks	Doug Long	DB	Whitworth	
Seattle Seahawks	Cornell Webster	CB	Tulsa	
Tampa Bay Buccaneers	Cecil Johnson	LB	Pittsburgh	
Tampa Bay Buccaneers	Dana Nafziger	LB	Cal Poly	
Tampa Bay Buccaneers	Jack Wender	RB	Fresno State	
Washington Redskins	Clarence Harmon	RB	Mississippi State	
Washington Redskins	Mark Murphy ^{†}	S	Colgate	

== Hall of Famers ==
- Tony Dorsett, running back from Pittsburgh, taken 1st round 2nd overall by Dallas Cowboys

Inducted: Professional Football Hall of Fame class of 1994.

- Tony Dungy, safety from Minnesota, undrafted and signed by Pittsburgh Steelers

Inducted: For his Head Coaching achievements Professional Football Hall of Fame class of 2016.

- Joe Klecko, defensive tackle from Temple, taken 6th round 144th overall by New York Jets

Inducted: Professional Football Hall of Fame Class of 2023.
