= 1977 Orange Bowl =

American college football game

- 43rd Orange Bowl
- The Miami Orange Bowl in Miami, Florida, hosted the Orange Bowl.
Ohio State Buckeyes	Colorado Buffaloes
(8–2–1)	(8–3)
Big Ten	Big Eight
27	10
Head coach: Woody Hayes	Head coach: Bill Mallory
AP / Coaches; 11 / 10	AP / Coaches; 12 / 12
	1	2	3	4	Total
Ohio State	7	10	3	7	27
Colorado	10	0	0	0	10
- Date: January 1, 1977
- Season: 1976
- Stadium: Orange Bowl
- Location: Miami, Florida
- MVP: Rod Gerald (Ohio State QB); Tom Cousineau (Ohio State LB)
- Favorite: Ohio State by 5 to 6½ points
- Referee: Robert Carpenter (ACC)
- Attendance: 65,537

United States TV coverage
- Network: NBC
- Announcers: Jim Simpson and John Brodie
- Nielsen ratings: 21.3

The 1977 Orange Bowl was the 43rd edition of the college football bowl game, played at the Orange Bowl in Miami, Florida, on Saturday, January 1. Part of the 1976–77 bowl game season, it matched the eleventh-ranked Ohio State Buckeyes of the Big Ten Conference and the #12 Colorado Buffaloes of the Big Eight Conference. Behind early, favored Ohio State won 27–10.

This was the only Orange Bowl between 1976 and 1981 without Oklahoma, and the only one from 1976 through 1989 without either the Sooners or Nebraska (the 1979 game matched both). The night before, Nebraska won the Astro-Bluebonnet Bowl, and Oklahoma took the Fiesta Bowl a week earlier.

It was the first Orange Bowl played on natural grass in seven years, since January 1970. Poly-Turf, similar to AstroTurf, was installed for the 1970 season, replaced in 1972, and removed in early 1976, following Super Bowl X.

== Teams ==
=== Ohio State ===
The Buckeyes were co-champions of the Big Ten Conference, but had been shut out at home by rival Michigan. Earlier at home, they lost to Missouri by a point and tied UCLA the next week. Ohio State was making its first bowl game appearance outside the Rose Bowl. This was the second season in which the Big Ten allowed multiple bowl teams; OSU had played in the previous year's Rose Bowl.

=== Colorado ===
The Buffaloes lost their opener at Texas Tech and also dropped games to Nebraska and at Missouri. They were co-champions of the Big Eight Conference, gaining the Miami berth with victories over the other two teams at 5–2, Oklahoma and Oklahoma State. Colorado was making its third Orange Bowl appearance; the last was fifteen years earlier, and they had not been to a major bowl since.

== Game summary ==
Underdog Colorado scored quickly, jumping out to an early 10–0 lead. Ohio State sophomore quarterback Rod Gerald, who had not played since the seventh game of the season due to a bone chip in his lower back, relieved starter Jim Pacenta late in the first quarter and led the Buckeyes to victory.

Gerald rushed 14 times for 81 yards, including 17 on his first carry setting up a 36-yard scoring run by Jeff Logan. Ohio State was on the scoreboard with 3:11 to go in the first quarter. The Buckeyes scored on their next two possessions with a 28-yard field goal by Tom Skladany and Pete Johnson's three-yard run with 24 seconds remaining before halftime. That capped a 99-yard drive after a blocked Colorado field goal attempt, and gave Ohio State the lead for good.

Skladany added another short field goal in the third quarter. Gerald ended the scoring with a four-yard run in the game's final minute and was named the outstanding player of the game on offense; sophomore linebacker Tom Cousineau took the defensive honor.

Colorado had two turnovers (both interceptions), but made only five first downs. Ohio State committed six turnovers (four fumbles, two interceptions), but its defense responded.

=== Scoring ===
First quarter

- Colorado – Mark Zetterberg 26-yard field goal, 9:04
- Colorado – Emery Moorehead 11-yard pass from Jeff Knapple (Zetterberg kick), 3:54
- Ohio State – Jeff Logan 36-yard run (Tom Skladany kick), 3:11

Second quarter

- Ohio State – Skladany 28-yard field goal, 9:33
- Ohio State – Pete Johnson 3-yard run (Skladany kick), 0:24

Third quarter

- Ohio State – Skladany 20-yard field goal, 2:30

Fourth quarter

- Ohio State – Rod Gerald 4-yard run (Skladany kick), 0:45

== Statistics ==
Statistics	Ohio State	Colorado
First downs	17	5
Rushes–yards	71–271	40–134
Passing yards	59	137
Passes (C–A–I)	2–7–2	8–23–0
Total Offense	78–330	63–271
Punts–average	3–42.2	7–35.2
Fumbles–lost	4–4	1–0
Turnovers	6	0
Penalties–yards	4–37	8–60

== Aftermath ==
Ohio State climbed to sixth in the final AP poll and Colorado fell to sixteenth.

The Buckeyes returned to the Orange Bowl in January 2014; through December 2019, this remains their only victory.

Colorado did not return for thirteen years, until consecutive appearances in 1990 and 1991, winning the latter for the a share of the national championship.
