= 1977 Cleveland Browns season =

NFL team season

- Owner: Art Modell
- Head coach: Forrest Gregg; Dick Modzelewski (interim)
- Home stadium: Cleveland Municipal Stadium

Results
- Record: 6–8
- Division place: 4th AFC Central
- Playoffs: Did not qualify
- Pro Bowlers: RB Greg Pruitt

The 1977 Cleveland Browns season was the team's 28th season with the National Football League. After a 6–4 start, the Browns lost their final four games of the season, to finish with a disappointing 6–8 record. With one game left in the season, head coach Forrest Gregg was fired and replaced by Dick Modzelewski.

== Offseason ==
=== NFL draft ===
The following were selected in the 1977 NFL draft.

1977 Cleveland Browns draft
Round	Selection	Player	Position	College	Notes
1	17	Robert L. Jackson	Linebacker	Texas A&M	
2	46	Tom Skladany	Punter	Ohio State	
4	102	Oliver Davis	Defensive back	Tennessee State	
4	110	Mickey Sims	Defensive tackle	South Carolina State	
7	173	Kenny Randle	Wide receiver	SMU	
7	184	Blane Smith	Linebacker	Purdue	
7	188	Bob Lingenfelter	Offensive tackle	Nebraska	
8	213	Bill Armstrong	Defensive back	Wake Forest	
9	240	Daryl Brown	Defensive back	Tufts	
10	269	Tom Burkett	Offensive tackle	North Carolina	
11	296	Charles Nash	Wide receiver	Arizona	
12	325	Leo Tierney	Center	Georgia Tech	

=== Undrafted free agents ===
1977 undrafted free agents of note
Player	Position	College
Darwin Logterman	Linebacker	Milton
Charlie Weatherbie	Quarterback	Oklahoma State

== Personnel ==
=== Staff / Coaches ===
1977 Cleveland Browns staff
Front office: Owner and president – Art Modell; Executive vice president/general manager – Peter Hadhazy; Head coaches: Head coaches – Forrest Gregg, Dick Modzelewski (interim); Offensive coaches: Running backs – George Sefcik; Wide receivers – Raymond Berry; Offensive line – Rod Humenuik	Defensive coaches: Defensive Coordinator — Dick Modzelewski; Linebackers – Walt Corey; Secondary / defensive backs – Billy Kinard; Special teams coaches: Special teams – Al Tabor; Film Coordinator – Ed Ulinski; Athletic Trainer – Leo Murphy

=== Roster ===
1977 Cleveland Browns roster
Quarterbacks: 7 Terry Luck; 8 Gary Marangi; 10 Dave Mays; Running backs: 30 Cleo Miller; 34 Greg Pruitt; 35 Brian Duncan; 38 Larry Poole; 43 Mike Pruitt; Wide receivers: 33 Reggie Rucker; 42 Paul Warfield; 80 Lawrence Williams; 83 Ricky Feacher; 85 Dave Logan; Tight ends: 81 Oscar Roan; 84 Gary Parris	Offensive linemen: 54 Tom DeLeone C; 62 Al Dennis G; 63 Barry Darrow T; 65 Henry Sheppard G; 68 Robert Jackson G; 73 Doug Dieken T; 75 Bob Lingenfelter T; 79 Gerry Sullivan T/C; Defensive linemen: 64 Joe Jones DE; 66 Earl Edwards DT; 70 Mack Mitchell DE; 72 Jerry Sherk DT; 74 Mike St. Clair DE; 78 Mickey Sims DT	Linebackers: 50 John Garlington OLB; 52 Dick Ambrose MLB; 55 Dave Graf OLB; 58 Mark Johnson OLB; 59 Charlie Hall OLB; 60 Bob Babich MLB; 86 Gerald Irons OLB; Defensive backs: 20 Tony Peters SS; 21 Oliver Davis CB; 22 Clarence Scott CB; 25 Rolly Woolsey CB; 27 Thom Darden FS; 28 Ron Bolton CB; 48 Ken Ellis CB; Special teams: 9 Greg Coleman P; 12 Don Cockroft K	Reserve lists: 69 Pete Adams G (IR); 56 Robert Jackson LB (IR); 47 Ricky Jones S (IR); 17 Brian Sipe QB (IR); 51 Leo Tierney C (IR); rookies in italics

== Preseason ==
Week	Date	Opponent	Result	Record	Attendance
1	August 8	Washington Redskins	L 14–16	0–1	32,554
2	August 13	at Minnesota Vikings	L 33–34	0–2	45,379
3	August 19	St. Louis Cardinals	W 19–10	1–2	31,308
4	August 25	Chicago Bears	W 14–7	2–2	36,598
5	September 3	at Green Bay Packers	W 19–14	3–2	53,180
6	September 9	at Detroit Lions	L 20–24	3–3	49,168

== Schedule ==
Week	Date	Opponent	Result	Record	Venue	Attendance	Recap
1	September 18	at **Cincinnati Bengals**	**W** 13–3	1–0	Riverfront Stadium	52,847	Recap
2	September 26	New England Patriots	**W** 30–27	2–0	Cleveland Municipal Stadium	76,418	Recap
3	October 2	**Pittsburgh Steelers**	**L** 14–28	2–1	Cleveland Municipal Stadium	80,588	Recap
4	October 9	Oakland Raiders	**L** 10–26	2–2	Cleveland Municipal Stadium	80,236	Recap
5	October 16	at **Houston Oilers**	**W** 24–23	3–2	Houston Astrodome	47,888	Recap
6	October 23	at Buffalo Bills	**W** 27–16	4–2	Rich Stadium	60,905	Recap
7	October 30	Kansas City Chiefs	**W** 44–7	5–2	Cleveland Municipal Stadium	60,381	Recap
8	November 6	**Cincinnati Bengals**	**L** 7–10	5–3	Cleveland Municipal Stadium	81,932	Recap
9	November 13	at **Pittsburgh Steelers**	**L** 31–35	5–4	Three Rivers Stadium	47,055	Recap
10	November 20	at New York Giants	**W** 21–7	6–4	Giants Stadium	72,576	Recap
11	November 27	Los Angeles Rams	**L** 0–9	6–5	Cleveland Municipal Stadium	70,352	Recap
12	December 4	at San Diego Chargers	**L** 14–37	6–6	San Diego Stadium	37,312	Recap
13	December 11	**Houston Oilers**	**L** 15–19	6–7	Cleveland Municipal Stadium	30,898	Recap
14	December 18	at Seattle Seahawks	**L** 19–20	6–8	Kingdome	61,583	Recap
Note: Intra-division opponents are in **bold** text.

=== Game summaries ===
==== Week 1 ====
The 1977 season started with a league rival and an impressive win.

Week 1: Cleveland Browns at Cincinnati Bengals

Quarter	1	2	3	4	Total
**Browns**	3	10	0	0	**13**
Bengals	0	0	3	0	**3**

at Riverfront Stadium • Cincinnati, Ohio

- Date: September 18, 1977
- Game time: 1:00 p.m.
- Game weather: 74 °F (23 °C) • Wind 12 mph (19 km/h)
- Game attendance: 52,847
- Referee: Bob Frederic
- TV announcers (NBC): Curt Gowdy and John Brodie
- Pro-Football-Reference.com

Game information

Browns

Bengals

Scoring summary

Quarter	Time	Drive			Team	Scoring information	Score	
Quarter	Time	Plays	Yards	TOP	Team	Scoring information	CLE	CIN
1					Browns	41-yard field goal by Cockroft	3	0
2					Browns	25-yard field goal by Cockroft	6	0
2					Browns	Poole 12-yard touchdown run, Cockroft kick good	13	0
3					Bengals	25-yard field goal by Bahr	13	3
"TOP" = time of possession. For other American football terms, see Glossary of American football.							13	3

==== Week 2 ====
The Cleveland Browns had not hosted nor been in a Monday Night Football game since the 1973 season, having lost at home against the Miami Dolphins. The Cleveland Stadium was sold out that night. The game went into overtime, and with a little more than 10 minutes left in over time, Don Cockroft kicked a 35-yard field goal to end the game with a win for the Browns.

==== Week 3 vs Steelers ====
Week Three: Pittsburgh Steelers (1–1) at Cleveland Browns (2–0)

Quarter	1	2	3	4	Total
**Steelers**	7	7	7	7	**28**
Browns	7	7	0	0	**14**

at Cleveland Municipal Stadium, Cleveland, Ohio

- Date: October 2
- Game time: 1:00 p.m.
- Game weather: 55 °F (13 °C)
- Game attendance: 80,588
- Referee: Fred Silva
- TV announcers (NBC): Curt Gowdy and Merlin Olsen
- Box Score

Game information

**First quarter**

- PIT – Lynn Swann 5-yard pass from Terry Bradshaw (Roy Gerela kick). Steelers 7–0. Drive:
- CLE – Dave Logan 22-yard pass from Brian Sipe (Don Cockroft kick). Tie 7–7. Drive:

**Second quarter**

- CLE – Cleo Miller 1-yard run (Don Cockroft kick). Browns 14–7. Drive:
- PIT – Frank Lewis 65-yard pass from Terry Bradshaw (Roy Gerela kick). Tie 14–14. Drive:

**Third quarter**

- PIT – Lynn Swann 14-yard pass from Terry Bradshaw (Roy Gerela kick). Steelers 21–14. Drive:

**Fourth quarter**

- PIT – Terry Bradshaw 1-yard run (Roy Gerela kick). Steelers 28–14. Drive:

Top passers

- PIT – Terry Bradshaw — 10/17, 143 yards, 3 TD, 2 INT
- CLE – Brian Sipe — 9/20, 81 yards, TD, INT

Top rushers

- PIT – Franco Harris — 22 rushes, 72 yards
- CLE – Cleo Miller — 11 rushes, 49 yards, TD

Top receivers

- PIT – Lynn Swann — 7 receptions, 71 yards, 2 TD
- CLE – Oscar Roan — 3 receptions, 43 yards

==== Week 5 ====
The Browns beat the Oilers 24–23 on another Cockroft last-second field goal. Toni Fritsch kicks a 37-yarder with 4:28 left to give Houston a 23–21 lead, but running back Greg Pruitt leads the Browns on their final scoring drive with three runs and a 13-yard third-down completion to Cleo Miller. Cockroft's six points lift him past Jim Brown to the no. 2 spot (behind Lou Groza) on the Browns' all-time scoring list.

=== Week 7 ===
Scoring their most points in 9 years, the Browns broke a team record with 34 first downs while rolling up 526 yards (322 rushing) in a rout over the Kansas City Chiefs 44-7. Greg Pruitt rushed for 153 yards. Brian Sipe threw for 200 yards and tight end Gary Parris caught two touchdown passes.

=== Standings ===
AFC Central
	W	L	T	PCT	DIV	CONF	PF	PA	STK
^{(3)} Pittsburgh Steelers	9	5	0	.643	4–2	7–5	283	243	W1
Houston Oilers	8	6	0	.571	3–3	6–6	299	230	W2
Cincinnati Bengals	8	6	0	.571	3–3	6–5	238	235	L1
Cleveland Browns	6	8	0	.429	2–4	5–7	269	267	L4
