= 1976 Kansas Jayhawks football team =

American college football season

1976 Kansas Jayhawks football
- Conference: Big Eight Conference
- Record: 6–5 (2–5 Big 8)
- Head coach: Bud Moore (2nd season)
- Offensive coordinator: John Levra (2nd season)
- Captains: Nolan Cromwell; Chris Golub
- Home stadium: Memorial Stadium

1976 Big Eight Conference football standings
	Conf.					Overall
Team	W		L		T	W		L		T
No. 16 Colorado +	5	–	2	–	0	8	–	4	–	0
No. 14 Oklahoma State +	5	–	2	–	0	9	–	3	–	0
No. 5 Oklahoma +	5	–	2	–	0	9	–	2	–	1
No. 19 Iowa State	4	–	3	–	0	8	–	3	–	0
No. 9 Nebraska	4	–	3	–	0	9	–	3	–	1
Missouri	3	–	4	–	0	6	–	5	–	0
Kansas	2	–	5	–	0	6	–	5	–	0
Kansas State	0	–	7	–	0	1	–	10	–	0
+ – Conference co-champions; Rankings from AP Poll

The 1976 Kansas Jayhawks football team represented the University of Kansas in the Big Eight Conference during the 1976 NCAA Division I football season. In their second season under head coach Bud Moore, the Jayhawks compiled a 6–5 record (2–5 against conference opponents), finished in seventh place in the conference, and outscored their opponents by a combined total of 260 to 251. They played their home games at Memorial Stadium in Lawrence, Kansas.

The team's statistical leaders included Nolan Cromwell with 273 passing yards, Laverne Smith with 978 rushing yards (completing his KU career averaging 6.5 yards per carry), and Waddell Smith with 221 receiving yards. Cromwell and Chris Golub were the team captains.

== Schedule ==
Date	Opponent	Rank	Site	Result	Attendance	Source
September 4	at Oregon State*	No. 19	Parker Stadium; Corvallis, OR	W 28–16	29,952	
September 11	Washington State*	No. 19	Memorial Stadium; Lawrence, KS	W 35–16	39,475	
September 18	Kentucky*	No. 13	Memorial Stadium; Lawrence, KS	W 37–16	50,170	
October 2	Wisconsin*	No. 9	Memorial Stadium; Lawrence, KS	W 34–24	48,350	
October 9	at Oklahoma State	No. 8	Lewis Field; Stillwater, OK	L 14–21	37,500	
October 16	No. 6 Oklahoma^{†}	No. 15	Memorial Stadium; Lawrence, KS	L 10–28	52,100	
October 23	at Kansas State		KSU Stadium; Manhattan, KS (rivalry)	W 24–14	43,500	
October 30	No. 9 Nebraska		Memorial Stadium; Lawrence, KS (rivalry)	L 3–31	50,850	
November 6	Iowa State		Memorial Stadium; Lawrence, KS	L 17–31	38,250	
November 13	at No. 19 Colorado		Folsom Field; Boulder, CO	L 17–40	47,850	
November 20	at No. 19 Missouri		Faurot Field; Columbia, MO (Border War)	W 41–14	62,559	
*Non-conference game; ^{†}Homecoming; Rankings from AP Poll released prior to the game

== Roster ==
1976 Kansas Jayhawks football team roster
Players
Coaches
Offense

Pos.	#	Name	Class
RB	23	Billy Campfield	Jr
QB	9	Nolan Cromwell	Sr
G	67	Dave Hentges	Sr
OT	64	Lindsey Mason	Jr
QB	10	Scott McMichael	Sr
RB	29	Skip Sharp	Sr
RB	30	Laverne Smith	Sr
WR	86	Waddell Smith	Sr
OT	72	Blake Thompson	Sr
C	54	Mike Wellman	So

Defense

Pos.	#	Name	Class
LB	78	Terry Beeson	Sr
DT	77	Mike Butler	Sr
DE	93	Tom Dinkel	Jr
CB	13	Tom Fitch	Jr
S		Chris Golub	Sr
DE	81	Steve Jones	Sr
LB	89	Jim Zidd	So

Special teams

Pos.	#	Name	Class

Head coach

- Bud Moore

Coordinators/assistant coaches

Legend

- (C) Team captain
- (S) Suspended
- (I) Ineligible
- Injured
- Redshirt
