= 1977 Detroit Lions season =

NFL team season

- Owner: William Clay Ford Sr.
- General manager: Russ Thomas
- Head coach: Tommy Hudspeth
- Home stadium: Pontiac Silverdome

Results
- Record: 6–8
- Division place: 3rd NFC Central
- Playoffs: Did not qualify
- All-Pros: None
- Pro Bowlers: None

The 1977 Detroit Lions season was their 48th in the National Football League (NFL). The team matched their previous season's output of 6–8, and missed the playoffs for the seventh straight season. The Lions struggled offensively, scoring a mere 183 points while finishing in third place with a 6–8 record for the second consecutive season.

The 1977 coaching staff included 25-year-old assistant special teams and offensive assistant coach Bill Belichick. Belichick would later win two Super Bowls in the 1986 and 1990 seasons as defensive coordinator with the New York Giants, and six as head coach of the New England Patriots.

This would be the final season for head coach Tommy Hudspeth before he and his entire staff were fired. This would also be the final season for future Hall-of-Fame tight end Charlie Sanders before his retirement.

== NFL draft ==
1977 Detroit Lions draft
Round	Pick	Player	Position	College	Notes
2	42	Walt Williams	CB	New Mexico State	
3	69	Rick Kane	RB	San Jose State	
4	96	Luther Blue	WR	Iowa State	
5	114	Ron Crosby	LB	Penn State	from Seattle
6	166	Reggie Pinkney	DB	East Carolina	from New England
7	179	Tim Black	LB	Baylor	
8	209	Mark Griffin	OT	North Carolina	
9	236	Steve Mathieson	QB	Florida State	
10	236	Gary Anderson	G	Stanford	
11	293	Tony Daykin	LB	Georgia Tech	
12	320	Dave Greenwood	G	Iowa State	
Made roster * Made at least one Pro Bowl during career

Notes

- Detroit traded its first-round pick (12th) to Buffalo in exchange for WR J.D. Hill.
- Detroit traded QB Bill Munson to Seattle in exchange for Seattle's fifth-round pick (114th).
- Detroit traded its fifth-round pick (125th) to Pittsburgh in exchange for TE John McMakin.
- Detroit traded its sixth-round pick (320th) and G Guy Dennis to San Diego in exchange for G Mark Markovich.
- Detroit traded WR Marlin Briscoe to New England in exchange for a sixth-round pick (166th).

=== Undrafted free agents ===
1977 undrafted free agents of note
Player	Position	College
Joe Harvey	Defensive tackle	Northern Michigan
Kevin McClain	Defensive back	Wyoming
John Stufllebeem	Punter	Navy
Bob Wood	Kicker	Michigan

== Personnel ==
=== Staff / Coaches ===
1977 Detroit Lions staff
Front office: President – William Clay Ford Sr.; Executive Vice President and General Manager – Russ Thomas; Vice President and Assistant General Manager – Roger Lehew; Head coaches: Head coach – Tommy Hudspeth; Offensive coaches: Offensive coordinator/quarterbacks/receivers – Ed Hughes; Offensive backfield – Wally English; Offensive line – John Payne; Offensive assistant – Bill Belichick	Defensive coaches: Defensive coordinator/defensive line – Fritz Shurmur; Linebackers – Rollie Dotsch; Defensive backfield – Burnie Miller; Special teams coaches: Special teams – Floyd Reese; Assistant special teams – Bill Belichick; Strength and conditioning: Strength and Conditioning – Floyd Reese

=== Roster ===
1977 Detroit Lions roster
Quarterbacks (QB): 16 Gary Danielson; 11 Greg Landry; 14 Joe Reed; Running backs (RB): 43 Andy Bolton; 24 Dexter Bussey; 31 Glenn Capriola; 44 Marv Hubbard; 32 Rick Kane; 25 Horace King; 34 Eddie Payton; Wide receivers (WR): 89 Luther Blue; 86 J. D. Hill; 45 Ray Jarvis; 39 Leonard Thompson; Tight ends (TE): 81 David Hill; 87 Bill Larson	Offensive linemen (OL): 60 Gary Anderson G; 62 Lynn Boden G; 73 Russ Bolinger G; 71 Craig Hertwig T; 64 Melvin Mitchell C; 63 Jon Morris C; 79 Dave Simonson T; 75 Jim Yarbrough T; Defensive linemen (DL): 78 Doug English DT; 74 Larry Hand DT; 83 Jim Mitchell DE; 88 Herb Orvis DT; 72 Ernie Price DE; 82 Ken Sanders DE; 77 John Woodcock DE	Linebackers (LB): 58 Tony Daykin OLB; 52 Jim Laslavic MLB; 50 Paul Naumoff OLB; 55 Ed O'Neil MLB; 57 Garth TenNapel OLB; 59 Charlie Weaver OLB; Defensive backs (DB): 20 Lem Barney CB/FS; 28 James Hunter CB; 26 Dick Jauron FS; 42 Reggie Pinkney SS; 40 Charlie West SS; 21 Walt Williams CB; Special teams (ST): 10 Steve Mike-Mayer K; 11 Wilbur Summers P	Reserve: 53 Ron Crosby LB (IR); 76 Rocky Freitas T (IR); 38 Lawrence Gaines FB (IR); 23 Levi Johnson S (IR); 65 Ken Long G (IR); 68 Mark Markovich G (IR); 1 Benny Ricardo K (IR); 88 Charlie Sanders TE (IR); Rookies in italics 45 active, 8 reserve, 0 practice squad

== Schedule ==
Week	Date	Opponent	Result	Record	Attendance
1	September 18	at **Chicago Bears**	**L** 30–20	0–1	51,530
2	September 25	New Orleans Saints	**W** 23–19	1–1	51,458
3	October 2	Philadelphia Eagles	**W** 17–13	2–1	57,236
4	October 9	at **Minnesota Vikings**	**L** 14–7	2–2	45,860
5	October 16	**Green Bay Packers**	**W** 10–6	3–2	78,452
6	October 23	at San Francisco 49ers	**L** 28–7	3–3	39,392
7	October 30	at Dallas Cowboys	**L** 37–0	3–4	63,160
8	November 6	San Diego Chargers	**W** 20–0	4–4	72,559
9	November 13	at Atlanta Falcons	**L** 17–6	4–5	47,461
10	November 20	**Tampa Bay Buccaneers**	**W** 16–7	5–5	49,751
11	November 24	**Chicago Bears**	**L** 31–14	5–6	71,373
12	December 4	at **Green Bay Packers**	**L** 10–9	5–7	56,267
13	December 11	at Baltimore Colts	**W** 13–10	6–7	45,124
14	December 17	**Minnesota Vikings**	**L** 30–21	6–8	78,572
Note: Intra-division opponents are in **bold** text.

=== Game summaries ===
==== Week 3 vs Philadelphia Eagles ====
Week 3: Philadelphia Eagles at Detroit Lions

Quarter	1	2	3	4	Total
Eagles	0	7	6	0	**13**
**Lions**	7	3	7	0	**17**

at Pontiac Silverdome, Pontiac, Michigan

- Date: October 2, 1977
- Game time: 2:00 p.m. EST
- TV announcers (CBS): Bob Costas and Nick Buoniconti

Game information

**First quarter**

**Second quarter**

**Third quarter**

**Fourth quarter**

Top passers

- PHI – Ron Jaworski – 13/24, 207 yards, 2 TD, INT
- DET – Greg Landry – 13/18, 125 yards, 1 TD

Top rushers

- PHI – Mike Hogan – 20 rushes, 67 yards
- DET – Horace King – 20 rushes, 68 yards

Top receivers

- PHI – Harold Carmichael – 4 receptions, 67 yards, TD
- DET – Horace King – 7 receptions, 60 yards

==== Week 8: vs San Diego Chargers ====
Week Eight: San Diego Chargers at Detroit Lions – Game summary

Quarter	1	2	3	4	Total
Chargers	0	0	0	0	**0**
**Lions**	0	0	7	13	**20**

at Pontiac Silverdome, Detroit, Michigan

- Date: November 6
- Game time: 4:00 p.m. EST
- Game weather: N/A (game played indoors)
- Game attendance: 72,559
- Referee: Jerry Markbreit
- TV announcers (NBC): Dick Stockton and Paul Maguire
- Box score

Game information

**First quarter**

- No scoring plays.

**Second quarter**

- No scoring plays.

**Third quarter**

- DET – Rick Kane 2-yard run (Steve Mike-Mayer kick), 5:08. Lions 7–0. **Drive: 13 plays, 59 yards, 7:10.**

**Fourth quarter**

- DET – Rick Kane 1-yard run (Steve Mike-Mayer kick), 9:56. Lions 14–0. **Drive: 9 plays, 70 yards, 4:09.**
- DET – Marv Hubbard 1-yard run (kick failed), 4:57. Lions 20–0. **Drive: 5 plays, 40 yards, 2:55.**

**Top passers**

- SDG – Bill Munson – 9/16, 90 yards
- DET – Greg Landry – 5/7, 67 yards

**Top rushers**

- SDG – Joe Washington – 9 rushes, 54 yards
- DET – Rick Kane – 24 rushes, 105 yards, 2 TD

**Top receivers**

- SDG – Rickey Young – 4 receptions, 48 yards
- DET – Horace King – 3 receptions, 49 yards

==== Week 9 at Atlanta Falcons ====
Week 9: Detroit Lions at Atlanta Falcons

Quarter	1	2	3	4	Total
Lions	6	0	0	0	**6**
**Falcons**	0	0	0	17	**17**

at Atlanta-Fulton County Stadium, Atlanta, Michigan

- Date: November 13, 1977
- Game time: 1:00 p.m. EST
- Game weather: Overcast, 39 °F (4 °C)
- TV announcers (CBS): Bob Costas and Nick Buoniconti

Game information

**First quarter**

**Second quarter**

**Third quarter**

**Fourth quarter**

Top passers

- DET – Greg Landry – 5/19, 59 yards, 2 INT
- ATL – Steve Bartkowski – 6/16, 81 yards, 3 INT

Top rushers

- DET – Rick Kane – 30 rushes, 81 yards, TD
- ATL – Haskel Stanback – 17 rushes, 59 yards

Top receivers

- DET – J. D. Hill – 3 receptions, 28 yards
- ATL – Alfred Jenkins – 2 receptions, 30 yards

==== Week 10: vs Tampa Bay Buccaneers ====
Week Ten: Tampa Bay Buccaneers at Detroit Lions – Game summary

Quarter	1	2	3	4	Total
Buccaneers	0	7	0	0	**7**
**Lions**	0	0	3	13	**16**

at Pontiac Silverdome, Pontiac, Michigan

- Date: November 20
- Game time: 2:00 p.m. EST
- Game weather: None (played indoors)
- Game attendance: 49,751
- Referee: Cal Lepore
- Box score

Game information

**First quarter**

- No scoring plays

**Second quarter**

- TB – Rickey Bell 4-yard run (Allan Leavitt kick). Buccaneers 7–0.

**Third quarter**

- DET – Steve Mike-Mayer 47-yard field goal. Buccaneers 7–3.

**Fourth quarter**

- DET – Rick Kane 1-yard run (kick failed). Lions 9–7.
- DET – Reggie Pinkney 48-yard interception return (Steve Mike-Mayer kick). Lions 16–7.

**Top passers**

- TB – Jeb Blount – 4/12, 56 yards, INT
- DET – Gary Danielson – 7/17, 80 yards, INT

**Top rushers**

- TB – Rickey Bell – 16 rushes, 59 yards, TD
- DET – Rick Kane – 18 rushes, 57 yards, TD

**Top receivers**

- TB – Isaac Hagins – 2 receptions, 57 yards
- DET – J. D. Hill – 3 receptions, 32 yards

== Standings ==
NFC Central
	W	L	T	PCT	DIV	CONF	PF	PA	STK
^{(3)} Minnesota Vikings	9	5	0	.643	6–1	8–4	231	227	W1
^{(4)} Chicago Bears	9	5	0	.643	6–1	8–4	255	253	W6
Detroit Lions	6	8	0	.429	2–5	4–8	183	252	L1
Green Bay Packers	4	10	0	.286	2–5	4–7	134	219	W1
Tampa Bay Buccaneers	2	12	0	.143	0–4	2–11	103	223	W2
