= Jim Harlan =

American football player (born 1954)

No. 68
- Position: Offensive tackle

Personal information
- Born: June 14, 1954 (age 72); Shreveport, Louisiana, U.S.
- Listed height: 6 ft 4 in (1.93 m)
- Listed weight: 250 lb (113 kg)

Career information
- High school: C.E. Byrd (Shreveport)
- College: Howard Payne
- NFL draft: 1977: 6th round, 155th overall pick

Career history
- Washington Redskins (1978)

Career NFL statistics
- Games played: 14
- Games started: 2
- Stats at Pro Football Reference

James Thomas Harlan (born June 14, 1954) is an American former professional football player who was an offensive tackle for the Washington Redskins of the National Football League (NFL).

He played college football for the Howard Payne Yellow Jackets and was selected in the sixth round of the 1977 NFL draft by the San Francisco 49ers.
