= Jim Van Wagner =

American football player (1955-2014)

No. 35
- Position: Running back

Personal information
- Born: May 3, 1955; Ann Arbor, Michigan, U.S.
- Died: November 29, 2014 (aged 59); Grants Pass, Oregon, U.S.
- Listed height: 6 ft 2 in (1.88 m)
- Listed weight: 202 lb (92 kg)

Career information
- High school: Carmel
- College: Michigan Tech
- NFL draft: 1977: 7th round, 183rd overall pick

Career history
- San Francisco 49ers (1977)*; New Orleans Saints (1978)
- * Offseason or practice squad member only
- Stats at Pro Football Reference

James Parker Van Wagner (May 3, 1955 – November 29, 2014) was an American football running back who played for the New Orleans Saints of the National Football League (NFL). He played college football at Michigan Tech University. He was an All-American and was twice the NCAA Division II rushing leader.
