= Jimmy Stewart (defensive back) =

American football player (born 1954)

No. 26, 46
- Position: Defensive back

Personal information
- Born: October 15, 1954 (age 72); St. Louis, Missouri
- Listed height: 5 ft 11 in (1.80 m)
- Listed weight: 190 lb (86 kg)

Career information
- High school: Normandy
- College: Tulsa
- NFL draft: 1977: 8th round, 201st overall pick

Career history
- New Orleans Saints (1977–1978); Detroit Lions (1979); New England Patriots (1980)
- Stats at Pro Football Reference

James Stewart (born October 15, 1954) is an American former professional football player who was a defensive back for the New Orleans Saints and the Detroit Lions of the National Football League (NFL). He played college football for the University of Tulsa.
