= 1976 Oklahoma Sooners football team =

American college football season

1976 Oklahoma Sooners football
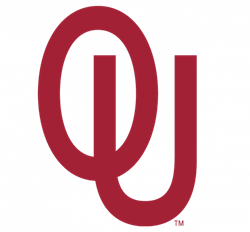

Big 8 co-champion Fiesta Bowl champion

Fiesta Bowl, W 41–7 vs. Wyoming
- Conference: Big Eight Conference

Ranking
- Coaches: No. 6
- AP: No. 5
- Record: 9–2–1 (5–2 Big 8)
- Head coach: Barry Switzer (4th season)
- Offensive coordinator: Galen Hall (4th season)
- Offensive scheme: Wishbone
- Defensive coordinator: Larry Lacewell (7th season)
- Base defense: 5–2
- Captains: Jerry Anderson; Scott Hill; Mike Vaughan
- Home stadium: Oklahoma Memorial Stadium

1976 Big Eight Conference football standings
	Conf.					Overall
Team	W		L		T	W		L		T
No. 16 Colorado +	5	–	2	–	0	8	–	4	–	0
No. 14 Oklahoma State +	5	–	2	–	0	9	–	3	–	0
No. 5 Oklahoma +	5	–	2	–	0	9	–	2	–	1
No. 19 Iowa State	4	–	3	–	0	8	–	3	–	0
No. 9 Nebraska	4	–	3	–	0	9	–	3	–	1
Missouri	3	–	4	–	0	6	–	5	–	0
Kansas	2	–	5	–	0	6	–	5	–	0
Kansas State	0	–	7	–	0	1	–	10	–	0
+ – Conference co-champions; Rankings from AP Poll

The 1976 Oklahoma Sooners football team represented the University of Oklahoma in the 1976 NCAA Division I football season. Oklahoma was a member of the Big Eight Conference and played its home games in Oklahoma Memorial Stadium, where it has played its home games since 1923. The team posted a 9–2–1 overall record and a 5–2–0 conference record to earn a share of the Conference title under head coach Barry Switzer who took the helm in 1973. This was Switzer's fourth conference title in four seasons.

The team was led by two All-Americans: Zac Henderson and Mike Vaughan. After tying with Oklahoma State and Colorado for the conference title, it earned a trip to the Fiesta Bowl where it came out victorious against the Wyoming Cowboys. During the season, it faced five ranked opponents (In order, #16 Texas, #15 Kansas, #19 Colorado, #11 Missouri and #10 Nebraska). Four of its opponents finished the season ranked. It tied with Texas in the Red River Shootout and lost to Oklahoma State and Colorado. The Sooners started the season with a 5–0–1 record. They also began and ended the season with four-game winning streaks. Sophomore Daryl Hunt's 177 tackles that season would stand as the school record for five years and continues to be the second highest total behind Jackie Shipp's 189 in 1981.

Kenny King led the team in rushing with 839 yards, Dean Blevins led the team in passing with 384 yards, Steve Rhodes led the team in receiving with 160 yards, Uwe von Schamann and Horace Ivory led the team in scoring with 72 points, Hunt led the team in tackles with a record-setting 177 as well as interceptions with 4.

== Schedule ==
Date	Opponent	Rank	Site	TV	Result	Attendance	Source
September 11	at Vanderbilt*	No. 5	Dudley Field; Nashville, TN		W 24–3	34,694	
September 18	California*	No. 4	Oklahoma Memorial Stadium; Norman, OK		W 28–17	71,286	
September 25	Florida State*	No. 4	Oklahoma Memorial Stadium; Norman, OK		W 24–9	71,184	
October 2	at Iowa State	No. 3	Cyclone Stadium; Ames, IA		W 24–10	48,500	
October 9	vs. No. 16 Texas*	No. 3	Cotton Bowl; Dallas, TX (Red River Shootout)	ABC	T 6–6	72,032	
October 16	at No. 15 Kansas	No. 6	Memorial Stadium; Lawrence, KS		W 28–10	52,100	
October 23	Oklahoma State	No. 5	Oklahoma Memorial Stadium; Norman, OK (Bedlam Series)		L 24–31	71,184	
October 30	at No. 19 Colorado	No. 13	Folsom Field; Boulder, CO		L 31–42	53,380	
November 6	Kansas State	No. 14	Oklahoma Memorial Stadium; Norman, OK		W 49–20	71,184	
November 13	No. 11 Missouri	No. 14	Oklahoma Memorial Stadium; Norman, OK (rivalry)		W 27–20	71,184	
November 26	at No. 10 Nebraska	No. 8	Memorial Stadium; Lincoln, NE (rivalry)	ABC	W 20–17	76,247	
December 25	vs. Wyoming*	No. 8	Sun Devil Stadium; Tempe, AZ (Fiesta Bowl)	CBS	W 41–7	48,714	
*Non-conference game; Rankings from AP Poll released prior to the game

== Rankings ==
Ranking movements Legend: ██ Increase in ranking ██ Decrease in ranking ( ) = First-place votes
	Week													
Poll	Pre	1	2	3	4	5	6	7	8	9	10	11	12	Final
AP	5 (6)	4 (4)	4 (3)	3 (2)	2 (3)	6	5	13	17	14	10	8	8	5

== Game summaries ==
=== Florida State ===
Florida State Seminoles at #4 Oklahoma Sooners

Team	1	2	3	4	Total
Florida State	6	0	3	0	9
• Oklahoma	3	14	0	7	24

- Date: Saturday, September 25
- Location: Oklahoma Memorial Stadium, Norman, Oklahoma
- Source: Eugene Register-Guard

Scoring summary
1	OKLA	von Schamann 40-yard field goal	OKLA 3-0
1	FSU	Key 5-yard run (kick failed)	FSU 6-3
2	OKLA	Ivory 37-yard run (von Schamann kick)	OKLA 10-6
2	OKLA	Ivory 23-yard run (von Schamann kick)	OKLA 17-6
3	FSU	Cappelen 41-yard field goal	OKLA 17-9
4	OKLA	Peacock 3-yard run (von Schamann kick)	OKLA 24-9

=== Texas ===
Team	1	2	3	4	Total
Texas	0	3	0	3	6
Oklahoma	0	0	0	6	6

- Date: October 9
- Location: Cotton Bowl
- Game attendance: 72,032
- TV announcers (ABC): Keith Jackson and Bud Wilkinson

=== Oklahoma State ===
Team	1	2	3	4	Total
• Oklahoma St	10	3	8	10	31
Oklahoma	14	7	3	0	24

- Date: October 23
- Location: Oklahoma Memorial Stadium

=== Kansas State ===
Team	1	2	3	4	Total
Kansas St	7	10	3	0	20
• Oklahoma	21	7	7	14	49

- Date: November 6
- Location: Oklahoma Memorial Stadium • Norman, Oklahoma
- Game attendance: 71,184

Scoring summary
1	OKLA	Ivory 4-yard run (von Schamann kick)	Oklahoma 7-0
1	OKLA	Ivory 6-yard run (von Schamann kick)	Oklahoma 14-0
1	KSU	Lovely 1-yard run (Sinovic kick)	Oklahoma 14-7
1	OKLA	King 30-yard run (von Schamann kick)	Oklahoma 21-7
2	OKLA	Lott 2-yard run (von Schamann kick)	Oklahoma 28-7
2	KSU	Whitley 9-yard pass from Henrikson (Sinovic kick)	Oklahoma 28-14
2	KSU	Sinovic 30-yard field goal	Oklahoma 28-17
3	KSU	Sinovic 39-yard field goal	Oklahoma 28-20
3	OKLA	Lott 11-yard run (von Schamann kick)	Oklahoma 35-20
4	OKLA	Lott 3-yard run (von Schamann kick)	Oklahoma 42-20
4	OKLA	Ivory 8-yard run (von Schamann kick)	Oklahoma 49-20

=== Nebraska ===
Team	1	2	3	4	Total
• Oklahoma	7	0	0	13	20
Nebraska	0	3	14	0	17

- Date: November 26
- Location: Memorial Stadium
- Game attendance: 76,247
- TV announcers (ABC): Keith Jackson and Ara Parseghian

Scoring summary
Q1	0:16	OKLA	Peacock 1 yard run (von Schamann kick)	OKLA 7–0
Q2	9:06	NEB	Eveland 33 yard field goal	OKLA 7–3
Q3	9:56	NEB	Craig 9 yard run (Eveland kick)	NEB 10–7
Q3	6:31	NEB	Berns 4 yard run (Eveland kick)	NEB 17–7
Q4	12:28	OKLA	Peacock 50 yard run (run failed)	NEB 17–13
Q4	0:38	OKLA	Peacock 2 yard run (von Schamann kick)	OKLA 20–17

== Roster ==
1976 Oklahoma Sooners football team roster
Players
Coaches
Offense

Pos.	#	Name	Class
OT	67	Karl Baldischwiler	Jr
QB	2	Dean Blevins	Jr
OT	63	Sam Claphan	So
WR	15	Jim Culbreath	Sr
RB	28	George Cumby	Fr
WR	33	Bud Hebert	So
TE	80	Victor Hicks	So
RB	32	Horace Ivory	Sr
RB	30	Kenny King	So
QB	6	Thomas Lott	So
RB	11	Fred Nixon	Fr
OT	66	Louis Oubre	Fr
RB	4	Elvis Peacock	Jr
SE	3	Darrol Ray	Fr
SE	24	Steve Rhodes	Fr
G	65	Greg Roberts	So
RB	34	Jimmy Rogers	So
HB	23	Woodie Shepard	So
HB	20	Billy Sims	So
OT	79	Mike Vaughan (C)	Sr

Defense

Pos.	#	Name	Class
DB	17	Jerry Anderson (C)	Sr
DE	72	John Goodman	Fr
S	1	Zac Henderson	Jr
S	7	Scott Hill (C)	Sr
DT	70	Dave Hudgens	Jr
LB	85	Daryl Hunt	So
DT	62	Reggie Kinlaw	So
DE	58	Reggie Mathis	So
DT	74	Phil Tabor	So

Special teams

Pos.	#	Name	Class
K	10	Uwe von Schamann	So

Head coach

- Barry Switzer (4th year)

Coordinators/assistant coaches

- Donnie Duncan (assistant)
- Gary Gibbs (GA)
- Galen Hall (OC)
- Warren Harper (LB)
- Gene Hochevar
- Larry Lacewell (DC)
- Rex Norris (DL)
- Gerald O'Dell
- Jerry Pettibone
- Lucious Selmon (DL)
- Mike Shanahan (GA)

Legend

- (C) Team captain
- (S) Suspended
- (I) Ineligible
- Injured
- Redshirt

Roster

== Awards and honors ==
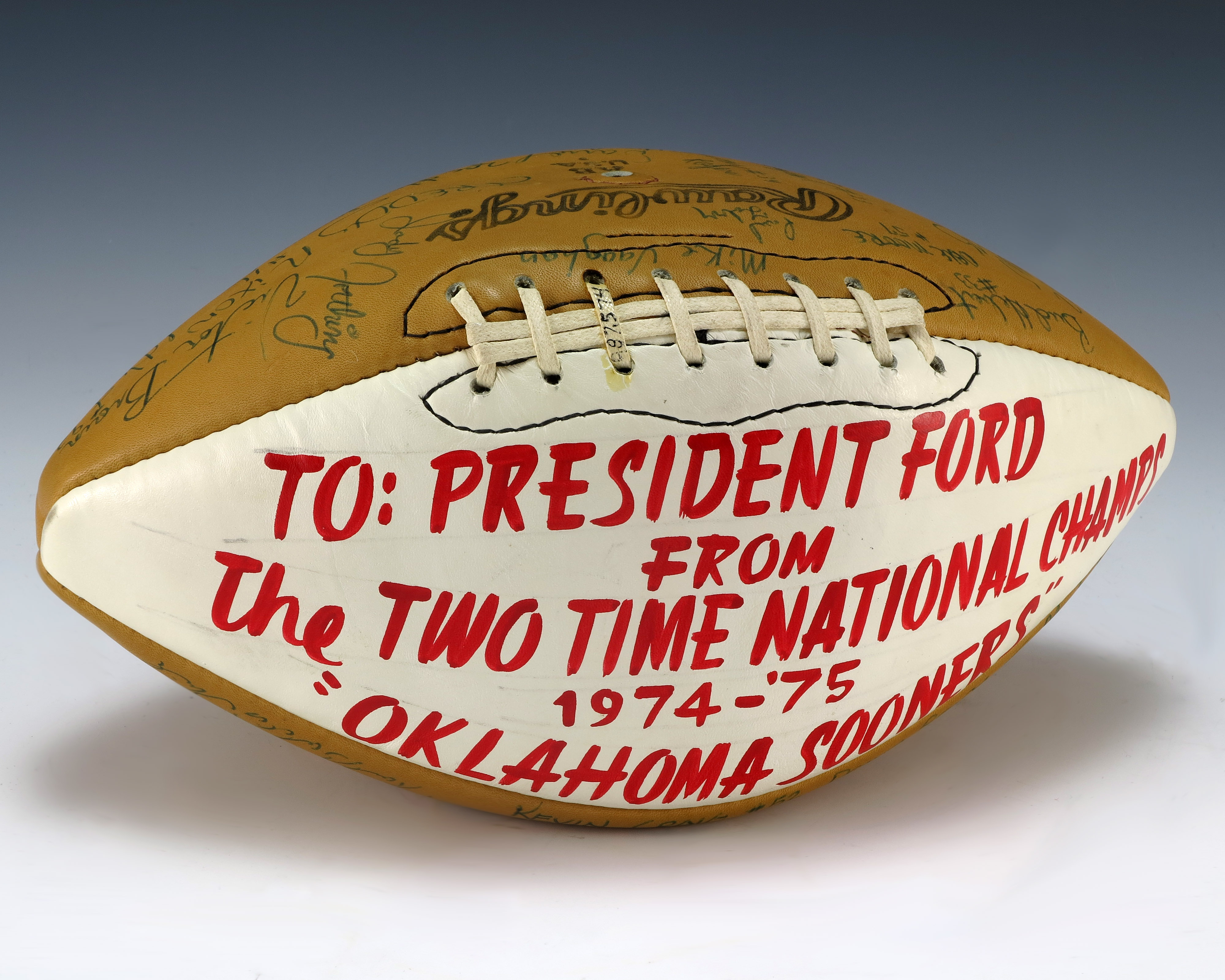
A football signed by the 1976 Oklahoma Sooners, including Billy Sims and J. C. Watts, that was gifted to President Gerald Ford.

- All-American: Zac Henderson and Mike Vaughan

== NFL draft ==
The following players were drafted into the National Football League following the season.

Round	Pick	Player	Position	NFL team
2	44	Horace Ivory	Running back	New England Patriots
3	82	Sidney Brown	Defensive back	New England Patriots
4	88	Mike Vaughan	Tackle	New York Giants
4	105	Jerry Anderson	Defensive back	Cincinnati Bengals
10	260	Jim Culbreath	Running back	Green Bay Packers
