= Gary Woolford =

American football player (born 1954)

No. 20
- Position: Cornerback

Personal information
- Born: May 4, 1954 (age 72); Cairo, Illinois, U.S.
- Listed height: 6 ft 0 in (1.83 m)
- Listed weight: 180 lb (82 kg)

Career information
- High school: Joliet West (Joliet, Illinois)
- College: Florida State
- NFL draft: 1977: 6th round, 148th overall pick

Career history
- Houston Oilers (1977–1978); San Francisco 49ers (1979)*; New York Giants (1980); St. Louis Cardinals (1981)*
- * Offseason or practice squad member only

Career NFL statistics
- Games played - started: 12 - 8
- Interceptions: 2
- Fumble recoveries: 1
- Stats at Pro Football Reference

Gary Steven Woolford (born May 4, 1954) is an American former professional football player who was a defensive back for the New York Giants of the National Football League (NFL) in 1980. Woolford played college football for the Florida State Seminoles.
