= 1976 Colorado Buffaloes football team =

American college football season

1976 Colorado Buffaloes football

Big Eight co-champion

Orange Bowl, L 10–27 vs. Ohio State
- Conference: Big Eight Conference

Ranking
- Coaches: No. 16
- AP: No. 16
- Record: 8–4 (5–2 Big 8)
- Head coach: Bill Mallory (3rd season)
- Offensive coordinator: George Belu (3rd season)
- Offensive scheme: I formation
- Defensive coordinator: Bob Reublin (3rd season)
- Base defense: 5–2
- MVP: Tony Reed
- Captain: Emery Moorehead
- Home stadium: Folsom Field

1976 Big Eight Conference football standings
	Conf.					Overall
Team	W		L		T	W		L		T
No. 16 Colorado +	5	–	2	–	0	8	–	4	–	0
No. 14 Oklahoma State +	5	–	2	–	0	9	–	3	–	0
No. 5 Oklahoma +	5	–	2	–	0	9	–	2	–	1
No. 19 Iowa State	4	–	3	–	0	8	–	3	–	0
No. 9 Nebraska	4	–	3	–	0	9	–	3	–	1
Missouri	3	–	4	–	0	6	–	5	–	0
Kansas	2	–	5	–	0	6	–	5	–	0
Kansas State	0	–	7	–	0	1	–	10	–	0
+ – Conference co-champions; Rankings from AP Poll

The 1976 Colorado Buffaloes football team represented the University of Colorado Boulder in the Big Eight Conference (Big 8) during the 1976 NCAA Division I football season. In their third season under head coach Bill Mallory, the Buffaloes compiled an 8–4 record (5–2 against Big 8 opponents), finished in a three-way tie for the Big 8 championship, and outscored their opponents, 305 to 225. The team played its home games on campus at Folsom Field in Boulder, Colorado.

On New Year's night, Colorado played in the Orange Bowl for the first time in fifteen years, but were defeated 27–10 by the Ohio State Buckeyes of the Big Ten Conference.

The Buffaloes earned the Orange Bowl bid because they defeated the other teams involved in the three-way tie for first, Oklahoma and Oklahoma State. CU's next appearance in a bowl game was nine years away.

Colorado defeated Oklahoma for the first time in four years; their next win over the Sooners was thirteen years away.

== Schedule ==
Date	Opponent	Rank	Site	TV	Result	Attendance	Source
September 11	at Texas Tech*		Jones Stadium; Lubbock, TX		L 7–24	44,132	
September 18	at Washington*		Husky Stadium; Seattle, WA	ABC	W 21–7	36,600	
September 25	Miami (FL)*		Folsom Field; Boulder, CO		W 33–3	48,882	
October 2	Drake*		Folsom Field; Boulder, CO		W 45–24	45,318	
October 9	No. 6 Nebraska		Folsom Field; Boulder, CO (rivalry)		L 12–24	53,538	
October 16	at Oklahoma State		Lewis Field; Stillwater, OK		W 20–10	39,000	
October 23	No. 16 Iowa State^{†}		Folsom Field; Boulder, CO		W 33–14	51,413	
October 30	No. 13 Oklahoma	No. 19	Folsom Field; Boulder, CO		W 42–31	53,380	
November 6	at No. 16 Missouri	No. 14	Faurot Field; Columbia, MO		L 7–16	63,830	
November 13	Kansas	No. 19	Folsom Field; Boulder, CO		W 40–17	47,850	
November 20	at Kansas State	No. 15	KSU Stadium; Manhattan, KS (rivalry)		W 35–28	16,500	
January 1, 1977	vs. No. 11 Ohio State*	No. 12	Miami Orange Bowl; Miami, FL (Orange Bowl)	NBC	L 10–27	65,537	
*Non-conference game; ^{†}Homecoming; Rankings from AP Poll released prior to the game

== Roster ==
1976 Colorado Buffaloes football team roster
Players
Coaches
Offense

Pos.	#	Name	Class
QB	14	Jeff Austin	Sr
WR	1	Steve Gaunty	So
TE	89	Don Hasselbeck	Sr
QB	12	Jeff Knapple	So
RB	39	James Mayberry	So
RB	40	Emery Moorehead	Sr
RB	19	Tony Reed	Sr
QB	8	Bill Solomon	Fr
RB	38	Billy Waddy	Sr

Defense

Pos.	#	Name	Class
LB	49	Brian Cabral	Jr
S	36	Mike L. Davis	Sr
LB	55	Bart Roth	Sr
DB	47	Mike Spivey	Sr

Special teams

Pos.	#	Name	Class
PK	4	Mark Zetterberg	Sr

Head coach

- Bill Mallory

Coordinators/assistant coaches

Legend

- (C) Team captain
- (S) Suspended
- (I) Ineligible
- Injured
- Redshirt

Roster
