= 1976 Kansas State Wildcats football team =

American college football season

1976 Kansas State Wildcats football
- Conference: Big Eight Conference
- Record: 1–10 (0–7 Big 8)
- Head coach: Ellis Rainsberger (2nd season)
- Defensive coordinator: Dick Selcer (2nd season)
- Home stadium: KSU Stadium

1976 Big Eight Conference football standings
	Conf.					Overall
Team	W		L		T	W		L		T
No. 16 Colorado +	5	–	2	–	0	8	–	4	–	0
No. 14 Oklahoma State +	5	–	2	–	0	9	–	3	–	0
No. 5 Oklahoma +	5	–	2	–	0	9	–	2	–	1
No. 19 Iowa State	4	–	3	–	0	8	–	3	–	0
No. 9 Nebraska	4	–	3	–	0	9	–	3	–	1
Missouri	3	–	4	–	0	6	–	5	–	0
Kansas	2	–	5	–	0	6	–	5	–	0
Kansas State	0	–	7	–	0	1	–	10	–	0
+ – Conference co-champions; Rankings from AP Poll

The 1976 Kansas State Wildcats football team represented Kansas State University as a member of the Big Eight Conference during the 1976 NCAA Division I football season. Led by second-year head coach Ellis Rainsberger, the Wildcats compiled an overall record of 1–10 with a mark of 0–7 in conference play, placing last in the Big 8. Kansas played home games in KSU Stadium in Manhattan, Kansas.

== Schedule ==
Date	Opponent	Site	Result	Attendance	Source
September 11	BYU*	KSU Stadium; Manhattan, KS	W 13–3	27,100	
September 18	at No. 11 Texas A&M*	Kyle Field; College Station, TX	L 14–34	50,027	
September 25	Wake Forest*	KSU Stadium; Manhattan, KS	L 0–13	25,500	
October 2	at Florida State*	Doak Campbell Stadium; Tallahassee, FL	L 10–20	30,353	
October 9	No. 9 Missouri	KSU Stadium; Manhattan, KS	L 21–28	22,200	
October 16	at No. 3 Nebraska	Memorial Stadium; Lincoln, NE (rivalry)	L 0–51	76,150	
October 23	Kansas	KSU Stadium; Manhattan, KS (rivalry)	L 14–24	43,500	
October 30	at Iowa State	Cyclone Stadium; Ames, IA (rivalry)	L 14–45	43,500	
November 6	at No. 17 Oklahoma	Oklahoma Memorial Stadium; Norman, OK	L 20–49	71,184	
November 13	No. 17 Oklahoma State^{†}	KSU Stadium; Manhattan, KS	L 21–45	21,000	
November 20	No. 15 Colorado	KSU Stadium; Manhattan, KS (rivalry)	L 28–35	16,500	
*Non-conference game; ^{†}Homecoming; Rankings from AP Poll released prior to the game

== Roster ==
1976 Kansas State Wildcats football team roster
Players
Coaches
Offense

Pos.	#	Name	Class
TE	81	Paul Coffman	Jr

Defense

Pos.	#	Name	Class
DE	79	Mike Osborn	Jr
LB	59	Gary Spani	Jr
DB	32	Marvin Switzer	Sr

Special teams

Pos.	#	Name	Class

Head coach

- Ellis Rainsberger

Coordinators/assistant coaches

Legend

- (C) Team captain
- (S) Suspended
- (I) Ineligible
- Injured
- Redshirt
