= Dave LaCrosse =

American football player (born 1955)

No. 54
- Position: Linebacker

Personal information
- Born: December 22, 1955 (age 70); Philadelphia, Pennsylvania, U.S.
- Listed height: 6 ft 3 in (1.91 m)
- Listed weight: 210 lb (95 kg)

Career information
- High school: Archbishop Kennedy (Conshohocken, Pennsylvania)
- College: Wake Forest (1973–1976)
- NFL draft: 1977: 10th round, 271st overall pick

Career history
- Pittsburgh Steelers (1977); Kansas City Chiefs (1979)*; Philadelphia Eagles (1980)*
- * Offseason or practice squad member only
- Stats at Pro Football Reference

David Joseph LaCrosse (born December 22, 1955) is an American former professional football linebacker who played one season with the Pittsburgh Steelers of the National Football League (NFL). He was selected by the Steelers in the tenth round of the 1977 NFL draft. He played college football at Wake Forest University.

== Early life and college ==
David Joseph LaCrosse was born on December 22, 1955, in Philadelphia, Pennsylvania. He attended Archbishop Kennedy High School in Conshohocken, Pennsylvania.

He did not plan on playing college football until he received a scholarship offer from Wake Forest University. He was then a member of the Wake Forest Demon Deacons from 1973 to 1976.

== Professional career ==
LaCrosse was selected by the Pittsburgh Steelers in the tenth round, with the 271st overall pick, of the 1977 NFL draft. In 2023, LaCrosse noted that when a Wake Forest trainer woke up him to inform him that he had been drafted, LaCrosse just said "What?" and went back to bed. Upon being asked why he was so unexcited, LaCrosse stated that "Being drafted wasn’t on my radar. I enjoyed football but it wasn’t worth the pain and anguish to me."

He played in all 14 games for the Steelers during his rookie year in 1977 and recorded one fumble recovery. He appeared in one playoff game that year as well. He was released on August 14, 1978.

LaCrosse signed with the Kansas City Chiefs on March 27, 1979, and was later released on August 7, 1979.

He was signed by the Philadelphia Eagles on April 1, 1980, but was later released.

== Personal life ==
After his NFL career, LaCrosse spent some time working for Equifax. He also started an insurance investigations business that he ran for 20 years before retiring.
