= Jack Wender =

American football player (born 1954)

No. 38
- Position: Running back

Personal information
- Born: May 31, 1954 (age 72); San Francisco, California, U.S.
- Listed height: 6 ft 0 in (1.83 m)
- Listed weight: 210 lb (95 kg)

Career information
- High school: Fremont (Sunnyvale, California)
- College: Fresno State
- NFL draft: 1977: undrafted

Career history
- Tampa Bay Buccaneers (1977)
- Stats at Pro Football Reference

Jack Wender (born May 31, 1954) is an American former professional football player who was a running back for the Tampa Bay Buccaneers of the National Football League (NFL) in 1977. He played college football for the Fresno State Bulldogs.
