= Doug Long (American football) =

American football player (1955–2012)

No. 88, 23
- Position: Defensive back

Personal information
- Born: May 24, 1955; Spokane, Washington, U.S.
- Died: January 21, 2012 (aged 56); Olympia, Washington, U.S.
- Listed height: 6 ft 0 in (1.83 m)
- Listed weight: 189 lb (86 kg)

Career information
- High school: Shelton
- College: Whitworth
- NFL draft: 1977: undrafted

Career history
- Seattle Seahawks (1977–1978)
- Stats at Pro Football Reference

Douglas Long (May 24, 1955 – January 21, 2012) was an American football defensive back in the National Football League (NFL) who played for the Seattle Seahawks. He played college football at Whitworth University.
