= Gary Anderson (offensive lineman) =

American football player (born 1955)

No. 60, 77
- Position: Guard

Personal information
- Born: September 22, 1955 (age 71); Fairfield, California, U.S.
- Listed height: 6 ft 3 in (1.91 m)
- Listed weight: 253 lb (115 kg)

Career information
- High school: Placer (Auburn, California)
- College: Stanford (1973–1976)
- NFL draft: 1977: 10th round, 263rd overall pick

Career history
- Detroit Lions (1977–1978); New Orleans Saints (1978); Washington Redskins (1980); Oakland Invaders (1983); Jacksonville Bulls (1984–1985)

Career NFL statistics
- Games played: 21
- Games started: 3
- Fumble recoveries: 4
- Stats at Pro Football Reference

Gary Allan Anderson (born September 22, 1955) is an American former professional football player who was a guard in the National Football League (NFL) for the Detroit Lions, Washington Redskins and New Orleans Saints. He played college football for the Stanford Cardinal and was selected by the Lions in the 10th round of the 1977 NFL draft.
