= Mickey Sims =

American football player (1955–2006)

No. 99
- Position: Defensive tackle

Personal information
- Born: March 5, 1955; Myrtle Beach, South Carolina, U.S.
- Died: June 7, 2006 (aged 51); Parma, Ohio, U.S.
- Listed height: 6 ft 5 in (1.96 m)
- Listed weight: 278 lb (126 kg)

Career information
- College: South Carolina State
- NFL draft: 1977: 4th round, 110th overall pick

Career history
- Cleveland Browns (1977–1979)

Career NFL statistics
- Sacks: 3
- Fumble recoveries: 6
- Stats at Pro Football Reference

Robert Anderson "Mickey" Sims (March 5, 1955 – June 7, 2006) was an American professional football defensive tackle in the National Football League (NFL). He was drafted by the Cleveland Browns in the fourth round of the 1977 NFL draft. He played college football at South Carolina State.

Sims started for the Browns at defensive tackle in 1977, registering 19 tackles that season while filling in for the injured Jerry Sherk. Upon Sherk's return to the lineup, Sims played as a backup until he was released by the team after the 1979 season. Sims joined the Cleveland Metropark Police Department as a police officer in 1980 and was promoted to sergeant in 1997. He also was a part-time police officer at Cuyahoga Community College's West Campus in Parma. He was serving on the job at Tri-C when he died June 7, 2006, of a heart attack. He was 51. Sims also was a longtime deacon at Cornerstone Missionary Baptist Church in Cleveland. Sims' son Rob Jr., a former standout football player at Nordonia High School and The Ohio State University, followed his father to the NFL when he was drafted in April 2006 as a guard by the Seattle Seahawks.
