= Mike Spivey (American football) =

American football player (1954–2023)

No. 47, 45
- Position: Defensive back

Personal information
- Born: March 10, 1954; Houston, Texas, U.S.
- Died: June 26, 2023 (aged 69); Denver, Colorado, U.S.
- Listed height: 6 ft 0 in (1.83 m)
- Listed weight: 197 lb (89 kg)

Career information
- High school: Aldine (Houston)
- College: Colorado
- NFL draft: 1977: 2nd round, 43rd overall pick

Career history
- Chicago Bears (1977–1979); Oakland Raiders (1980); New Orleans Saints (1980–1981); Atlanta Falcons (1982)

Awards and highlights
- Super Bowl champion (XV); First-team All-Big Eight (1976)

Career NFL statistics
- Interceptions: 1
- Fumble recoveries: 1
- Stats at Pro Football Reference

Mike Spivey (March 10, 1954 – June 26, 2023) was an American professional football player who was a defensive back in the National Football League (NFL) for the Chicago Bears, Oakland Raiders, New Orleans Saints, and Atlanta Falcons. He played college football for the Colorado Buffaloes.

Spivey died in Denver, Colorado on June 26, 2023, at the age of 69.
