= Terry Beeson =

American football player (born 1955)

No. 58, 63
- Position: Linebacker

Personal information
- Born: September 19, 1955 (age 71); Coffeyville, Kansas, U.S.
- Listed height: 6 ft 3 in (1.91 m)
- Listed weight: 240 lb (109 kg)

Career information
- College: Kansas
- NFL draft: 1977: 2nd round, 41st overall pick

Career history
- Seattle Seahawks (1977–1981); San Francisco 49ers (1982); Oklahoma Outlaws (1984); Jacksonville Bulls (1985)

Awards and highlights
- PFWA All-Rookie Team (1977); Second-team All-Big Eight (1976)

Career NFL statistics
- Interceptions: 1
- Fumble recoveries: 2
- Sacks: 4
- Stats at Pro Football Reference

Terry Eugene Beeson (born September 19, 1955) is an American former professional football player who was a linebacker in the National Football League (NFL). He played in the NFL for the Seattle Seahawks from 1977 to 1981 and the San Francisco 49ers in 1982. He held the Seahawks record for most tackles in a season with 153 until linebacker Bobby Wagner broke it in 2016. Beeson finished his career in the United States Football League (USFL), playing for the Oklahoma Outlaws in 1984 and Jacksonville Bulls the following year.

Beeson was inducted into the Kansas Sports Hall of Fame in 2015.
