= Chris Golub =

American football player (1954-1978)

No. 47
- Position: Safety

Personal information
- Born: December 2, 1954; Kansas City, Missouri, U.S.
- Died: November 10, 1978 (aged 23)
- Listed height: 6 ft 2 in (1.88 m)
- Listed weight: 196 lb (89 kg)

Career information
- High school: Shawnee Mission North
- College: Kansas (1973–1976)
- NFL draft: 1977: 7th round, 177th overall pick

Career history
- Kansas City Chiefs (1977)

Career NFL statistics
- Games played: 1
- Stats at Pro Football Reference

Christopher David Golub (December 2, 1954 – November 10, 1978) was an American professional football safety who played for the Kansas City Chiefs of the National Football League (NFL). He played college football at University of Kansas.

Golub was killed in a car crash in November 1978.
