= Luther Blue =

American gridiron football player (born 1954)

No. 89, 80
- Position: Wide receiver

Personal information
- Born: October 21, 1954 (age 72); Valdosta, Georgia, U.S.
- Listed height: 5 ft 11 in (1.80 m)
- Listed weight: 185 lb (84 kg)

Career information
- High school: Valdosta
- College: Iowa State
- NFL draft: 1977: 4th round, 96th overall pick

Career history
- Detroit Lions (1977–1979); Philadelphia Eagles (1980); Toronto Argonauts (1981)

Awards and highlights
- First-team All-American (1976); First-team All-Big Eight (1976)

Career NFL statistics
- Receptions: 47
- Receiving yards: 542
- Receiving TDs: 4
- Stats at Pro Football Reference

Luther Blue (born October 21, 1954) is an American former professional football player who was a wide receiver for the Detroit Lions and Philadelphia Eagles of the National Football League (NFL) from 1977–80. He played college football for the Iowa State Cyclones from 1974–76 and was inducted into the Iowa State Cyclones Hall of Fame in 2007.

== College career ==
As a Cyclone, Blue amassed 1,273 receiving yards over his three years, with nine career touchdowns and 63 total receptions. As a sophomore in 1974, Blue led the team in receiving yards with 450 on 26 catches, with four receiving touchdowns, and a fifth TD coming on an 83-yard kickoff return for a score. Blue dealt with injury issues throughout 1975, ending the season with just ten receptions for 179 yards. In 1976, however, for a Cyclones team that would be ranked for the first time under coach Earle Bruce, Blue led the Cyclones in receptions (33), receiving yards (644), and receiving touchdowns (5). Blue logged his second career kickoff return TD in the Cyclones 37–28 victory over the #9 Nebraska Cornhuskers, their second top-ten victory of the season after having won on the road at the #7 Missouri Tigers, 21–17.

After his senior season, Blue was named a First Team All-American as well as a First Team member of the All-Big Eight Conference team. Blue's 32.8 yards-per-return on kickoffs in the 1974 season remains the record for Iowa State football for a single season, and his career yards-per-return of 26.47 sits second, less than half-a-yard behind Kene Nwangwu (26.85). Blue's 18.4 yards-per-reception over the duration of his career is also second for Cyclones with at least ten receptions, behind only Hakeem Butler (19.5 yards-per-reception).

== Professional career ==
Blue was a fourth round draft pick in the 1977 NFL draft by the Detroit Lions. As a Lion, he appeared in 39 games between 1977–79. His best season would come in 1978, catching 31 passes for 350 yards with two touchdowns and appearing in every game, starting all but one, for a Lions team that would finish 7–9. He would conclude his career in the NFL as a Philadelphia Eagle for the 1980 season, appearing in three games. Blue would finish his career with 47 receptions for 542 yards with four touchdowns, all with the Lions.
