= Sidney Brown (American football) =

American football player (born 1955)

No. 21
- Position: Cornerback

Personal information
- Born: July 3, 1955 (age 71); New Orleans, Louisiana, U.S.
- Listed height: 6 ft 0 in (1.83 m)
- Listed weight: 186 lb (84 kg)

Career information
- High school: St. Augustine (New Orleans)
- College: Oklahoma
- NFL draft: 1977: 3rd round, 82nd overall pick

Career history
- New England Patriots (1977–1979)
- Stats at Pro Football Reference

Sidney Louis Brown Jr. (born July 3, 1955) is an American former professional football cornerback who played for the New England Patriots of the National Football League (NFL). He played college football for the Oklahoma Sooners and was selected by the Patriots in the third round of the 1977 NFL draft.

== Early life ==
Sidney Louis Brown Jr. was born on July 3, 1955, in New Orleans, Louisiana. He attended St. Augustine High School in New Orleans.

== College career ==
Brown enrolled at the University of Oklahoma to play college football for the Sooners. He played for the freshman team in 1973 was a three-year letterman from 1974 to 1976. On September 28, 1974, he broke his jaw in a game against Utah State. Brown had his jaw wired shut for three games but only sat out one of them. During that three-game stretch, he had to mashup his meals and drink them through a strew. During the summer of 1975, he worked as a roustabout on an offshore oil drilling rig in the Gulf of Mexico.

== Professional career ==
Brown was selected by the New England Patriots in the third round, with the 82nd overall pick, of the 1977 NFL draft. He was placed on injured reserve on August 31, 1977, and missed the entire 1977 season. He played in all 16 games for the Patriots in 1978 as a reserve cornerback. Brown also appeared in one playoff game. He was placed on injured reserve on August 14, 1979, missing his second season in three years. He became a free agent after the 1979 season.
