= 1976 Oklahoma State Cowboys football team =

American college football season

1976 Oklahoma State Cowboys football

Big Eight co-champion Tangerine Bowl champion

Tangerine Bowl, W 49–21 vs. BYU
- Conference: Big Eight Conference

Ranking
- Coaches: No. 14
- AP: No. 14
- Record: 9–3 (5–2 Big 8)
- Head coach: Jim Stanley (4th season)
- Home stadium: Lewis Field

1976 Big Eight Conference football standings
	Conf.					Overall
Team	W		L		T	W		L		T
No. 16 Colorado +	5	–	2	–	0	8	–	4	–	0
No. 14 Oklahoma State +	5	–	2	–	0	9	–	3	–	0
No. 5 Oklahoma +	5	–	2	–	0	9	–	2	–	1
No. 19 Iowa State	4	–	3	–	0	8	–	3	–	0
No. 9 Nebraska	4	–	3	–	0	9	–	3	–	1
Missouri	3	–	4	–	0	6	–	5	–	0
Kansas	2	–	5	–	0	6	–	5	–	0
Kansas State	0	–	7	–	0	1	–	10	–	0
+ – Conference co-champions; Rankings from AP Poll

The 1976 Oklahoma State Cowboys football team represented Oklahoma State University during the 1976 NCAA Division I football season. Running back Terry Miller had 1,714 rushing yards on 291 attempts, averaging 5.9 yards per attempt, and 23 touchdowns. Miller finished fourth in the Heisman Trophy voting.

== Schedule ==
Date	Opponent	Rank	Site	Result	Attendance	Source
September 11	Tulsa*		Lewis Field; Stillwater, OK (rivalry)	W 33–21	38,000	
September 18	at No. 12 Arkansas*		War Memorial Stadium; Little Rock, AR	L 10–16	55,103	
October 2	North Texas State*		Lewis Field; Stillwater, OK	W 16–10	35,500	
October 9	No. 8 Kansas		Lewis Field; Stillwater, OK	W 21–14	37,500	
October 16	Colorado		Lewis Field; Stillwater, OK	L 10–20	39,000	
October 23	at No. 5 Oklahoma		Oklahoma Memorial Stadium; Norman, OK (Bedlam Series)	W 31–24	71,184	
October 30	No. 10 Missouri^{†}	No. 16	Lewis Field; Stillwater, OK	W 20–19	48,500	
November 6	at No. 9 Nebraska	No. 13	Memorial Stadium; Lincoln, NE	L 10–14	76,272	
November 13	at Kansas State	No. 17	KSU Stadium; Manhattan, KS	W 45–21	21,000	
November 20	No. 14 Iowa State	No. 16	Lewis Field; Stillwater, OK	W 42–21	48,500	
November 27	at UTEP*	No. 14	Sun Bowl; El Paso, TX	W 42–13	5,700	
December 18	vs. BYU*	No. 14	Citrus Bowl; Orlando, FL (Tangerine Bowl)	W 49–21	37,812	
*Non-conference game; ^{†}Homecoming; Rankings from AP Poll released prior to the game

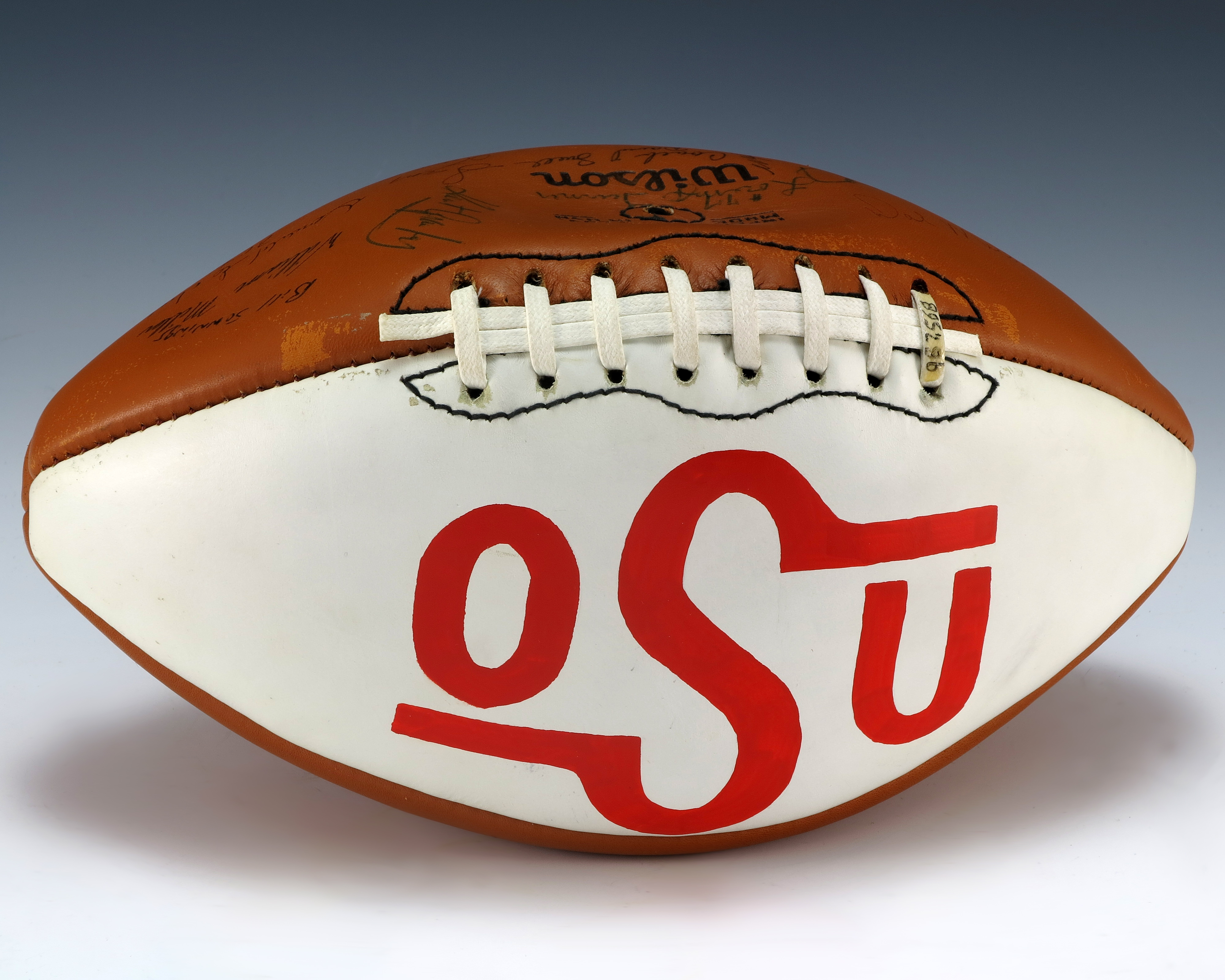
A football signed by the 1976 Oklahoma State Cowboys football team

== Roster ==
- QB Charlie Weatherbie, Sr.
- RB Terry Miller, Jr.
- OT Milton Hardaway, Jr.
- TE Donnie Echols, Fr.

== After the season ==
The 1977 NFL draft was held on May 3–4, 1977. The following Cowboys were selected.

Round	Pick	Player	Position	NFL club
1	12	Phil Dokes	Defensive tackle	Buffalo Bills
6	147	Cliff Parsley	Punter	New Orleans Saints
7	172	Derrel Gofourth	Guard	Green Bay Packers
9	237	Robert Turner	Running back	Miami Dolphins
10	277	Ron Baker	Guard	Baltimore Colts
