= Jim Culbreath =

American football player (1952–2018)

No. 31, 29, 32
- Position: Running back

Personal information
- Born: October 21, 1952; Yeadon, Pennsylvania, U.S.
- Died: March 12, 2018 (aged 65); Lansdowne, Pennsylvania, U.S.
- Listed height: 6 ft 0 in (1.83 m)
- Listed weight: 209 lb (95 kg)

Career information
- College: Oklahoma
- NFL draft: 1977: 10th round, 260th overall pick

Career history
- Green Bay Packers (1977–1979); New York Giants (1980); Philadelphia Eagles (1980)

Awards and highlights
- 2× National champion (1974, 1975)

Career NFL statistics
- Rushing attempts: 48
- Rushing yards: 156
- Receptions: 9
- Receiving yards: 84
- Stats at Pro Football Reference

James Clifford Culbreath Jr. (October 21, 1952 – March 12, 2018) was an American professional football running back in the National Football League (NFL) for the Green Bay Packers, the New York Giants, and the Philadelphia Eagles. He played college football at the University of Oklahoma and was drafted in the tenth round of the 1977 NFL draft.

Culbreath died on March 12, 2018.
