= 1976 Iowa State Cyclones football team =

American college football season

1976 Iowa State Cyclones football
- Conference: Big Eight Conference

Ranking
- Coaches: No. 18
- AP: No. 19
- Record: 8–3 (4–3 Big 8)
- Head coach: Earle Bruce (4th season)
- Defensive coordinator: Pete Rodriguez (1st season)
- Captains: Dave Greenwood; Tony Hawkins; Wayne Stanley; Maynard Stensrud
- Home stadium: Cyclone Stadium

1976 Big Eight Conference football standings
	Conf.					Overall
Team	W		L		T	W		L		T
No. 16 Colorado +	5	–	2	–	0	8	–	4	–	0
No. 14 Oklahoma State +	5	–	2	–	0	9	–	3	–	0
No. 5 Oklahoma +	5	–	2	–	0	9	–	2	–	1
No. 19 Iowa State	4	–	3	–	0	8	–	3	–	0
No. 9 Nebraska	4	–	3	–	0	9	–	3	–	1
Missouri	3	–	4	–	0	6	–	5	–	0
Kansas	2	–	5	–	0	6	–	5	–	0
Kansas State	0	–	7	–	0	1	–	10	–	0
+ – Conference co-champions; Rankings from AP Poll

The 1976 Iowa State Cyclones football team represented Iowa State University in the Big Eight Conference during the 1976 NCAA Division I football season. In their fourth year under head coach Earle Bruce, the Cyclones compiled an 8–3 record (4–3 against conference opponents), tied for fourth place in the conference, and outscored opponents by a combined total of 369 to 216. They played their home games at Cyclone Stadium (now known as Jack Trice Stadium) in Ames, Iowa.

Dave Greenwood, Tony Hawkins, Wayne Stanley, and Maynard Stensrud were the team captains.

== Schedule ==
Date	Time	Opponent	Rank	Site	Result	Attendance	Source
September 11	1:30 pm	Drake*		Cyclone Stadium; Ames, IA	W 58–14	41,000	
September 18	2:30 pm	at Air Force*		Falcon Stadium; Colorado Springs, CO	W 41–6	26,554	
September 25	1:30 pm	Kent State*		Cyclone Stadium; Ames, IA	W 47–7	37,000	
October 2	1:30 pm	No. 3 Oklahoma		Cyclone Stadium; Ames, IA	L 10–24	48,500	
October 9	1:30 pm	Utah*		Cyclone Stadium; Ames, IA	W 44–14	38,000	
October 16	1:30 pm	at No. 7 Missouri		Faurot Field; Columbia, MO (rivalry)	W 21–17	63,500	
October 23	2:30 pm	at Colorado	No. 16	Folsom Field; Boulder, CO	L 14–33	51,413	
October 30	1:30 pm	Kansas State^{†}		Cyclone Stadium; Ames, IA (rivalry)	W 45–14	43,500	
November 6	1:30 pm	at Kansas		Memorial Stadium; Lawrence, KS	W 31–17	38,250	
November 13	1:30 pm	No. 9 Nebraska		Cyclone Stadium; Ames, IA (rivalry)	W 37–28	51,500	
November 20	1:30 pm	at No. 16 Oklahoma State	No. 14	Lewis Field; Stillwater, OK	L 21–42	48,500	
*Non-conference game; ^{†}Homecoming; Rankings from AP Poll released prior to the game; All times are in Central time

== Game summaries ==
=== Nebraska ===
#9 Nebraska at Iowa State

Team	1	2	3	4	Total
No. 9 Cornhuskers	7	6	0	15	28
• Cyclones	17	3	0	17	37

- Date: November 13
- Location: Cyclone Stadium, Ames, Iowa
- Game attendance: 51,500

== Roster ==
1976 Iowa State Cyclones football team roster
Players
Coaches
Offense

Pos.	#	Name	Class
WR	91	Luther Blue	Sr
OT	68	Kevin Cunningham	Jr
RB	21	Jeff Curry	So
TE	85	Al Dixon	Jr
RB	24	Dexter Green	So
QB	8	Buddy Hardeman	Jr

Defense

Pos.	#	Name	Class
DT	69	Dave Cheesebrough	So
CB	7	Kevin Hart	Jr
S	14	Tony Hawkins	Sr
DL	63	Mike Stensrud	So
CB	3	Joe Valasa	Sr

Special teams

Pos.	#	Name	Class
K	2	Craig Manske	So

Head coach

- Earle Bruce

Coordinators/assistant coaches

- Jim Williams – Offensive line

Legend

- (C) Team captain
- (S) Suspended
- (I) Ineligible
- Injured
- Redshirt
