= 1976 Missouri Tigers football team =

American college football season

1976 Missouri Tigers football
- Conference: Big Eight Conference
- Record: 6–5 (3–4 Big 8)
- Head coach: Al Onofrio (6th season)
- Offensive coordinator: Dick Jamieson (5th season)
- Defensive coordinator: Vince Tobin (6th season)
- Home stadium: Memorial Stadium

1976 Big Eight Conference football standings
	Conf.					Overall
Team	W		L		T	W		L		T
No. 16 Colorado +	5	–	2	–	0	8	–	4	–	0
No. 14 Oklahoma State +	5	–	2	–	0	9	–	3	–	0
No. 5 Oklahoma +	5	–	2	–	0	9	–	2	–	1
No. 19 Iowa State	4	–	3	–	0	8	–	3	–	0
No. 9 Nebraska	4	–	3	–	0	9	–	3	–	1
Missouri	3	–	4	–	0	6	–	5	–	0
Kansas	2	–	5	–	0	6	–	5	–	0
Kansas State	0	–	7	–	0	1	–	10	–	0
+ – Conference co-champions; Rankings from AP Poll

The 1976 Missouri Tigers football team was an American football team that represented the University of Missouri in the Big Eight Conference (Big 8) during the 1976 NCAA Division I football season. The team compiled a 6–5 record (3–4 against Big 8 opponents), finished in sixth place in the Big 8, and was outscored by opponents by a combined total of 246 to 241. Al Onofrio was the head coach for the sixth of seven seasons. The team played its home games at Faurot Field in Columbia, Missouri.

The team's statistical leaders included Curtis Brown with 844 rushing yards, Pete Woods with 996 passing yards and 1,189 yards of total offense, Joe Stewart with 834 receiving yards, and placekicker Tim Gibbons with 62 points scored.

== Schedule ==
Date	Opponent	Rank	Site	Result	Attendance	Source
September 11	at No. 8 USC*		Los Angeles Memorial Coliseum; Los Angeles, CA	W 46–25	49,535	
September 18	Illinois*	No. 6	Faurot Field; Columbia, MO (rivalry)	L 6–31	63,486	
September 25	at No. 2 Ohio State*		Ohio Stadium; Columbus, OH	W 22–21	87,936	
October 2	No. 14 North Carolina*	No. 12	Faurot Field; Columbia, MO	W 24–3	60,676	
October 9	at Kansas State	No. 9	KSU Stadium; Manhattan, KS	W 28–21	22,200	
October 16	Iowa State	No. 7	Faurot Field; Columbia, MO (rivalry)	L 17–21	63,500	
October 23	at No. 3 Nebraska	No. 17	Memorial Stadium; Lincoln, NE (rivalry)	W 34–24	76,051	
October 30	at No. 16 Oklahoma State	No. 10	Lewis Field; Stillwater, OK	L 19–20	48,500	
November 6	No. 14 Colorado	No. 16	Faurot Field; Columbia, MO	W 16–7	63,830	
November 13	at No. 14 Oklahoma	No. 11	Oklahoma Memorial Stadium; Norman, OK (rivalry)	L 20–27	71,184	
November 20	Kansas	No. 19	Faurot Field; Columbia, MO (Border War)	L 14–41	62,559	
*Non-conference game; Rankings from AP Poll released prior to the game

== Game summaries ==
=== At Ohio State ===
Missouri Tigers (1–1) at #2 Ohio State Buckeyes (2–0)

Quarter	1	2	3	4	Total
Missouri	0	7	7	8	22
Ohio St	0	21	0	0	21

at Ohio Stadium, Columbus, Ohio

- Date: September 25, 1976
- Game time: 1:30 p.m.
- Game weather: Sunny, 70 °F (21 °C)
- Game attendance: 87,936
- Box Score

Game information

First quarter

- No scoring

Second quarter

- OSU – Pete Johnson 2-yard run (Tom Skladany kick), 14:25. Ohio St 7–0. Drive: 13 plays, 80 yards, 4:34.
- UM – Joe Stewart 31-yard pass from Pete Woods (Tim Gibbons kick), 11:56. Tie 7–7. Drive: 8 plays, 79 yards, 2:22.
- OSU – Pete Johnson 2-yard run (Tom Skladany kick), 9:47. Ohio St 14–7. Drive: 6 plays, 77 yards, 2:02.
- OSU – Pete Johnson 3-yard run (Tom Skladany kick), 7:33. Ohio St 21–7. Drive: 2 plays, 12 yards, 0:22.

Third quarter

- UM – Curtis Brown 4-yard run (Tim Gibbons kick), 9:00. Ohio St 21–14. Drive: 8 plays, 36 yards, 2:50.

Fourth quarter

- UM – Leo Lewis 2-yard pass from Pete Woods (run good), 0:12. Missouri 22–21. Drive: 12 plays, 80 yards, 4:30.

Top passers

- UM – Pete Woods – 9/19, 113 yards, 2 TD, 2 INT
- OSU – Rod Gerald – 1/8, 9 yards, INT

Top rushers

- UM – Curtis Brown – 20 rushes, 108 yards, TD
- OSU – Pete Johnson – 23 rushes, 119 yards, 3 TD

Top receivers

- UM – Joe Stewart – 3 receptions, 65 yards, TD
- OSU – Herman Jones – 1 reception, 9 yards

External videos
- Game highlights (part 1)
- Game highlights (part 2)
- Game highlights (part 3)
- Game film (silent)

== Roster ==
1976 Missouri Tigers football team roster
Players
Coaches
Offense

Pos.	#	Name	Class
C	55	Pete Allard	So
RB	25	Curtis Brown	Sr
RB	33	Rich Dansdill	So
FB	32	Annise Davis	Jr
WR	80	Lamont Downer	So
C	66	Marty Engman	Sr
RB	23	Earl Gant	So
OT, G	64	Garry Hiebert	Jr
G	65	Tom Kowalczyk	Sr
RB	24	Dean Leibson	Jr
WR	10	Leo Lewis	So
C	51	Larry McDevitt	Sr
WR	88	Percy McBride	Sr
QB	11	Paul Miller	So
TE	84	Mike Owens	So
QB	15	Steve Pisarkiewicz	Sr
WR	45	Joe Stewart	Jr
OT	76	James Taylor	Jr
OT	75	Morris Towns	Sr
G	61	Mark Wahlmeier	Jr
RB	43	Jornel Williams	Sr
TE	83	Kellen Winslow	So
QB	18	Pete Woods	Jr
G	77	Joel Yearian	Sr

Defense (C)

Pos.	#	Name	Class
DB	27	Chuck Banta	Sr
DT	69	Doug Bentlage	Sr
DB	2	Bruce Carter	Sr
DT	79	Don Cole	Jr
DB	41	Bob Fitzgerald	Sr
DT	91	Randy Frisch	Sr
LB	68	Chris Garlich	So
DE	94	Steve Hamilton	So
LB	38	Tim Helm	Sr
DE	95	Blaine Henningsen	Sr
LB	57	Tom Hodge	Sr
DT	72	Curtis Kirkland	Sr
LB	52	Mark Kirkpatrick	Sr
DB	40	Jim Leavitt	Jr
DB	22	Steve Mally	Jr
DT	74	Keith Morrissey	Jr
DB	7	Mike Newman	Sr
DB	8	Terry Newman	So
DB	16	Mark Phillips	Jr
DT	63	Doug Seymour	Sr
DE	93	Dale Smith	Sr
DT	92	Rickie Sutherland	Jr
DB	29	Dan Whitmer	Sr

Special teams

Pos.	#	Name	Class
P	26	Steve Blau	Jr
K	9	Tim Gibbons	Sr

Head coach

- Al Onofrio

Coordinators/assistant coaches

- Dick Jamieson – Offensive coordinator
- Vince Tobin – Defensive coordinator
- Dave McGinnis – Defensive backs
- Tony Steponovich – Aissistant
- Charlie Cowdrey – Assistant
- Curtis Jones Sr. – Assistant
- John Kadlec – Assistant
- Don Lawrence – Assistant

Legend

- (C) Team captain
- (S) Suspended
- (I) Ineligible
- Injured
- Redshirt
