= 1976 Nebraska Cornhuskers football team =

American college football season

1976 Nebraska Cornhuskers football

Astro-Bluebonnet Bowl champion

Astro-Bluebonnet Bowl, W 27–24 vs. Texas Tech
- Conference: Big Eight Conference

Ranking
- Coaches: No. 7
- AP: No. 9
- Record: 9–3–1 (4–3 Big 8)
- Head coach: Tom Osborne (4th season)
- Offensive scheme: I formation
- Defensive coordinator: Monte Kiffin (8th season)
- Base defense: 5–2
- Home stadium: Memorial Stadium

1976 Big Eight Conference football standings
	Conf.					Overall
Team	W		L		T	W		L		T
No. 16 Colorado +	5	–	2	–	0	8	–	4	–	0
No. 14 Oklahoma State +	5	–	2	–	0	9	–	3	–	0
No. 5 Oklahoma +	5	–	2	–	0	9	–	2	–	1
No. 19 Iowa State	4	–	3	–	0	8	–	3	–	0
No. 9 Nebraska	4	–	3	–	0	9	–	3	–	1
Missouri	3	–	4	–	0	6	–	5	–	0
Kansas	2	–	5	–	0	6	–	5	–	0
Kansas State	0	–	7	–	0	1	–	10	–	0
+ – Conference co-champions; Rankings from AP Poll

The 1976 Nebraska Cornhuskers football team represented the University of Nebraska–Lincoln in the 1976 NCAA Division I football season. The team was coached by Tom Osborne and played their home games in Memorial Stadium in Lincoln, Nebraska.

== Schedule ==
Date	Time	Opponent	Rank	Site	TV	Result	Attendance	Source
September 11	7:30 pm	at LSU*	No. 1	Tiger Stadium; Baton Rouge, LA		T 6–6	70,746	
September 18	1:30 pm	at Indiana*	No. 8	Memorial Stadium; Bloomington, IN		W 45–13	41,289	
September 25	1:30 pm	TCU*	No. 6	Memorial Stadium; Lincoln, NE		W 64–10	74,981	
October 2	1:30 pm	Miami (FL)*	No. 5	Memorial Stadium; Lincoln, NE (rivalry)		W 17–9	76,155	
October 9	2:30 pm	at Colorado	No. 6	Folsom Field; Boulder, CO (rivalry)		W 24–12	53,538	
October 16	1:30 pm	Kansas State^{†}	No. 3	Memorial Stadium; Lincoln, NE (rivalry)		W 51–0	76,150	
October 23	2:25 pm	No. 17 Missouri	No. 3	Memorial Stadium; Lincoln, NE (rivalry)	ABC	L 24–34	76,051	
October 30	1:30 pm	at Kansas	No. 9	Memorial Stadium; Lawrence, KS (rivalry)		W 31–3	50,850	
November 6	1:30 pm	No. 13 Oklahoma State	No. 9	Memorial Stadium; Lincoln, NE		W 14–10	76,272	
November 13	1:30 pm	at Iowa State	No. 9	Cyclone Stadium; Ames, IA (rivalry)		L 28–37	51,500	
November 26	1:20 pm	No. 8 Oklahoma	No. 10	Memorial Stadium; Lincoln, NE (rivalry)	ABC	L 17–20	76,247	
December 4	11:30 pm	at Hawaii*	No. 13	Aloha Stadium; Halawa, HI		W 68–3	33,737	
December 31	7:08 pm	vs. No. 9 Texas Tech*	No. 13	Houston Astrodome; Houston, TX (Astro-Bluebonnet Bowl)	TVS	W 27–24	48,618	
*Non-conference game; ^{†}Homecoming; Rankings from AP Poll released prior to the game; All times are in Central time

== Roster ==
Altman, Dick (So.) WB; Anderson, Rene #2 (Jr.) RCB; Andrews, George #96 (So.) DE; Anthony, Monte #49 (Jr.) IB; Avery, Scott #93 (Sr.) DT; Barnett, Bill #97 (So.) DT; Belka, Jim #47 (Sr.) LB; Berns, Richard #35 (So.) IB; Bishop, Keith #53 (So.) C Bloom, Jeff (So.) C Brannon, Mike (So.) DT; Brock, Dan #94 (Sr.) DT; Brown, Kenny #22 (So.) WB; Bryant, Bill #95 (So.) DT; Burns, Ed #17 (Sr.) QB; Burton, Mike (So.) DB; Butterfield, Dave #34 (Sr.) LCB; Cabell, Jake #24 (Sr.) LCB; Carpenter, Jeff #37 (Jr.) LB; Cass, Dan (So.) LCB; Clark, Kelvin #73 (So.) OT; Cole, Lawrence #92 (So.) DE; Cooley, Lawrence #67 (So.) OG; Cotton, Barney #54 (So.) C Craig, Curtis #33 (Jr.) WB; Davis, Tom #52 (Jr.) C Donnell, Dodie #45 (Jr.) FB; Dufresne, Mark #88 (Jr.) TE; Eichelberger, Percy #44 (Sr.) SLB; Eveland, Al #43 (Sr.) PK; Everett, Earl #9 (Sr.) WB; Ewing, Ben #26 (So.) WLB; Ferragamo, Vince #15 (Sr.) QB; Fischer, Tim #16 (Jr.) LCB; Fultz, Mike #72 (Sr.) DT; Galano, Bobby (So.) OG; Garcia, Randy #18 (Jr.) QB; Gast, Reg #82 (Jr.) DE; Gillespie, Dave #28 (Sr.) IB	Glenn, Steve #71 (So.) OT; Goodspeed, Mark (So.) DT; Hager, Tim #10 (So.) QB; Hansen, Jeff #48 (So.) S Harvey, Ted #31 (Jr.) RCB; Havekost, John (So.) OG; Hayes, Bob #76 (Jr.) OT; Henson, Zac #79(Jr..) OLK; Higgs, Gary #46 (Sr.) FB; Hipp, I.M. #32 (So.) IB; Hoins, Steve #78 (Sr.) OT; Horn, Brian (So.) TE; Horn, Rod #55 (So.) MG; Humphrey, Lawrence (Unk) OT; Ingram, John #19 (So.) S Jorgensen, Greg #63 (Jr.) OG; Kennedy, Mike #11 (So.) QB; Kroneberger, Jon #64 (So.) OT; Kujath, Kim #36 (Jr.) FB; Kunz, Lee #38 (So.) SLB; LaFever, Dan (Fr.) WLB; Lee, Oudious #65 (So.) MG; Lehigh, Pat #6 (So.) LCB; Lessman, Randy #39 (Sr.) P Lindquist, Steve #68 (So.) OG; Lingenfelter, Bob #70 (Sr.) OT; Link, Rob (So.) TE; Loken, Rocke #87 (Jr.) SE; Long, Doug (So.) SLB; Malito, Chuck #89 (Sr.) SE; Markus, Steve #56 (Jr.) SLB; Nitzel, Ron #85 (Sr.) SE; Ohrt, Tom #74 (So.) OT; Payne, Dennis #13 (So.) S Phillips, Ray #80 (Sr.) DE; Pillen, Clete #61 (Sr.) SLB; Pillen, Jim #29 (So.) MON; Plucknett, John #50 (Sr.) MG; Poeschl, Randy #75 (So.) DT; Potadle, Paul (So.) OT	West, Dave #91 (Sr.) DT; Pullen, Jeff #66 (Jr.) MG; Rick, Randy #90 (Jr.) DE; Ridder, Tom (So.) DE; Roehrs, Kelvin (So.) MG; Ruud, John (So.) WLB; Saalfeld, Kelly (So.) OT; Samuel, Tony #98 (Jr.) DE; Schmidt, Dan #51 (Sr.) OG; Selko, John #83 (So.) TE; Shamblin, Dave #81 (Sr.) SE; Smith, Kent #23 (Jr.) MON; Smith, Tim #84 (So.) SE; Sorley, Tom #12 (So.) QB; Stark, Jared #86 (Jr.) TE; Steiner, Dan #58 (So.) OG; Steward, Keith #40 (So.) FB; Stewart, Byron #30 (So.) IB; Stewart, Eric (So.) S Stovall, Rod #5 (Jr.) RCB; Stroh, Mark (So.) DE; Sukup, Dean #3 (So.) PK; Theissen, Gordon (So.) DE; Thomas, Bobby #8 (Sr.) SE; Valasek, Larry #4 (Jr.) S VanderMeer, Ron #1 (Sr.) PK; Vanous, Russ #25 (Jr.) P Vering, Tom #57 (So.) WLB; Waldemore, Stan #62 (Jr.) OG; Walderzak, Paul #77 (So.) OT; Walton, Darrell #7 (So.) WB; Washington, Mike #42 (So.) FB; West, Bruce #85 (Sr.) /DE; Weinmaster, Kerry (So.) MG; Wightman, Jim #59 (Jr.) WLB; Williquette, Jim #41 (So.) RCB; Young, Larry #14 (So.) MON; Young, Willie (So.) C Zabrocki, Dale #21 (Jr.) IB

=== 1976 Depth chart ===
Defense

FS
Larry Valasek
Jeff Hansen
Dennis Payne

INSDIE	INSDIE
Cletus Pillen	Jim Whightman
Jeff Carpenter	Precy Eichelberger
Lee Kunz	Jim Belka

MONSTER BACK
Kent Smith
Jim Pillen
Larry Young

CB
Ted Harvey
Pat Lehigh
Rod Stovall

DE	DT	NT	DT	DE
Ray Phillips	Ron Pruitt	Jeff Pullen	Mike Fultz	Tony Samuel
Georgie Andrews	Randy Poeschl	Kerry Winmaster	Dan Brock	Greg Gast
Randy Rick	Bill Barnett	Oudious Lee	Rod Horn	Tom Ridder

CB
Dave Butterfield
Rene Anderson
Jake Cabell

Offense

SE
Chuck Malito
Dave Shamblin
Rocke Loken

LT	LG	C	RG	RT
Bob Lingenfelter	Dan Schmidt	Tom Davis	Greg Jorgensen	Steve Hoins
Kelvin Clark	Stan Waldemore	Barney Cotton	Steve Lindquist	Tom Ohrt
Steve Glenn	Lawrence Cooley	Keith Bishop	Dan Steiner	Bob Hayes

TE
Ken Spaeth
Mark Dufresne
John Selko

WB
Bobby Thomas
Curtis Craig
Earl Everett

QB
Vince Ferragamo
Randy Garcia
Tom Sorley

FB
Dodie Donnell
Gary Higgs
Keith Steward

Special teams
PK Al Eveland
P Randy Lessman

RB
Rick Burns
Monte Anthony
Byron Stewart
Curtis Craig

== Coaching staff ==
Name	Title	First year in this position	Years at Nebraska	Alma mater
Tom Osborne	Head Coach; Offensive coordinator	1973	1964–1997	Hastings College
Monte Kiffin	Defensive Coordinator	1973	1967–1976	Nebraska
Cletus Fischer	Offensive Line		1960–1985	Nebraska
Jim Ross			1962–1976	
John Melton	Linebackers	1973	1962–1988	Wyoming
Mike Corgan	Running Backs	1962	1962–1982	Notre Dame
Warren Powers	Defensive Backs		1969–1976	Nebraska
Boyd Epley	Head Strength Coach	1969	1969–2003	Nebraska
Bill Myles	Linebackers	1975	1972–1976	Drake University
Jerry Moore	Wide Receivers	1973	1973–1978	Baylor
George Darlington	Defensive Ends		1973–2002	Rutgers
Milt Tenopir	Offensive Line	1974	1974–2002	Sterling
Guy Ingles	Freshman Head Coach	1976	1976–1978	Nebraska

== Game summaries ==
=== LSU ===
#1 Nebraska at LSU [box score]

Team	1	2	3	4	Total
#1 Nebraska	6	0	0	0	6
LSU	0	0	3	3	6

- Date: 1976-09-11
- Location: Tiger Stadium, Baton Rouge, Louisiana
- Game start: 7:30 pm CST
- Game attendance: 70,746
- Referee: R. Pete Williams

Top-ranked Nebraska quickly found the scoreboard with a touchdown just four minutes into the game, but a failed extra point attempt was the first sign of trouble to come, as the Cornhuskers failed to score again against a fierce LSU defense led by future NFL standout A.J. Duhe. The Tigers also struggled to make headway against the tenacious Blackshirts, managing just one field goal in each of the final two quarters, which resulted in a less than stellar beginning of the season for Nebraska as they were forced to settle for a 6–6 tie. LSU drove into field goal range in the closing seconds, but Mike Conway missed from 44 yards out.

This is the only time in six meetings vs. LSU that Nebraska failed to win.

=== Indiana ===
#8 Nebraska at Indiana [box score]

Team	1	2	3	4	Total
• #8 Nebraska	14	10	14	7	45
Indiana	0	0	7	6	13

- Date: 1976-09-18
- Location: Memorial Stadium, Bloomington, Indiana
- Game attendance: 41,289

Nebraska pushed Indiana around all day to make up for the previous week's disappointing tie game, running out ahead 38–0 before Indiana managed to score. Indiana had the slight edge in the air, but without enough points to back it up, the 248–89 Cornhusker domination on the ground told the story of the game.

=== TCU ===
TCU at #6 Nebraska [box score]

Team	1	2	3	4	Total
TCU	10	0	0	0	10
• #6 Nebraska	14	24	19	7	64

- Date: 1976-09-25
- Location: Memorial Stadium, Lincoln, Nebraska
- Game attendance: 74,981

TCU proposed to make it a game by scoring first, and was still in it with a slight 10–14 lag at the end of the 1st quarter, but the Horned Frogs proceeded to fall apart as the Cornhuskers quickly rolled off 50 unanswered points to steamroll their way to a 64–10 romp in the Lincoln home opener. Nebraska QB Vince Ferragamo tied the Nebraska record of four touchdowns in a game (by halftime), while ground responsibilities were widely shared as 5th-string IB Byron Stewart ended up with the day's rushing lead at 64 yards.

=== Miami ===
Miami at #5 Nebraska [box score]

Team	1	2	3	4	Total
Miami	6	0	0	3	9
• #5 Nebraska	0	0	7	10	17

- Date: 1976-10-02
- Location: Memorial Stadium, Lincoln, Nebraska
- Game attendance: 76,155

A hard-hitting game saw several players leaving the field with injuries as Nebraska fought from behind for the second week in a row, after having to start the 2nd half down 0–6. The Cornhuskers eventually wore the Hurricanes down in the end, putting up 10 more points while Miami was only able to add a field goal in their failed attempt to hold the lead.

=== Colorado ===
#6 Nebraska at Colorado [box score]

Team	1	2	3	4	Total
• #6 Nebraska	0	7	7	10	24
Colorado	3	9	0	0	12

- Date: 1976-10-09
- Location: Folsom Field, Boulder, Colorado
- Game attendance: 53,538

Colorado never did find the end zone, but Buffalo PK Mark Zetterberg split the uprights four times to account for all of Colorado's scores to put Nebraska behind 7–12 at the half. Those 12 points were not nearly enough to overcome the Nebraska 2nd half effort which ran off an additional 17 unanswered points to pull away from Colorado for the win.

=== Kansas State ===
Kansas State at #3 Nebraska [box score]

Team	1	2	3	4	Total
Kansas State	0	0	0	0	0
• #3 Nebraska	10	20	14	7	51

- Date: 1976-10-16
- Location: Memorial Stadium, Lincoln, Nebraska
- Game attendance: 76,150

Nebraska smashed Kansas State to celebrate homecoming, holding the Wildcats to a painful −45 yards of negative progress on the ground, as the Cornhuskers did not even have to defend their side of the field until late in the 3rd quarter when Nebraska gave up an interception. Still missing several players from injuries sustained in the previous two games, the Cornhusker machine rolled on anyway, as Nebraska QB Vince Ferragamo tied the school single-game touchdown record for the second time this season while the Blackshirts put up their only shutout of 1976.

=== Missouri ===
#17 Missouri at #3 Nebraska [box score]

Team	1	2	3	4	Total
• #17 Missouri	7	16	0	11	34
#3 Nebraska	6	12	3	3	24

- Date: 1976-10-23
- Location: Memorial Stadium, Lincoln, Nebraska
- Game attendance: 76,051

Missouri arrived in Lincoln on the way to owning an impressive upset thanks to a record-setting play. Nebraska was behind 18–23 at the half, but had obtained two field goals to pull ahead 24–23 at the start of the 4th quarter. The Tigers than scored on a spectacular 98-yard pass play and successful 2-point conversion to take the momentum back just two minutes later, and iced the win with 1:19 remaining on the game clock when they added 3 more on a field goal, handing the Cornhuskers their first loss of the season.

=== Kansas ===
#9 Nebraska at Kansas [box score]

Team	1	2	3	4	Total
• #9 Nebraska	7	14	7	3	31
Kansas	0	0	0	3	3

- Date: 1976-10-30
- Location: Memorial Stadium, Lawrence, Kansas
- Game attendance: 47,327

Kansas took the brunt of Nebraska's frustration following their loss to Missouri the week prior, as the Blackshirts only allowed the Jayhawks to cross midfield twice all day, while the Cornhusker offense accumulated 483 yards of total offense in the one-sided game. The lone Kansas score was a field goal against Nebraska reserves in the 4th quarter.

=== Oklahoma State ===
#13 Oklahoma State at #9 Nebraska [box score]

Team	1	2	3	4	Total
#13 Oklahoma State	0	3	7	0	10
• #9 Nebraska	0	0	7	7	14

- Date: 1976-11-06
- Location: Memorial Stadium, Lincoln, Nebraska
- Game attendance: 76,272

Both teams struggled to make progress against each other at the start as both defenses protected their end zones, and by the half only Oklahoma State had managed to put any points up, with a field goal midway through the 2nd quarter. The defensive battle continued after halftime, but the Cornhuskers were finally able to secure a 3rd-quarter touchdown, only to have the Cowboys answer it four minutes later and retake the lead 10–7. Nebraska was uncharacteristically losing the ground war, as Oklahoma State piled up a 291–121 edge in yards, and so turned to the air and found results as they amassed a 235–34 passing yardage lead, which included the game-winning touchdown pass with almost 12 minutes still remaining in the 4th quarter. The Blackshirts held from there on out to secure the victory.

=== Iowa State ===
#9 Nebraska at Iowa State [box score]

Team	1	2	3	4	Total
#9 Nebraska	7	6	0	15	28
• Iowa State	17	3	0	17	37

- Date: 1976-11-13
- Location: Cyclone Stadium, Ames, Iowa
- Game attendance: 51,500

Turnovers took a brutal toll on Nebraska, as the Cornhuskers fumbled eight times and gave up an interception in Ames. For the second week in a row, Nebraska was forced to go to the air for results as the Cyclones held them to just 77 rushing yards, but it was not enough, as Nebraska fell behind 0–10 early on and never recovered the lead in a heartbreaking road loss to an unranked team following their thrilling finish against #13 Oklahoma State the week before.

=== Oklahoma ===
#8 Oklahoma at #10 Nebraska [box score]

Team	1	2	3	4	Total
• #8 Oklahoma	7	0	0	13	20
#10 Nebraska	0	3	14	0	17

- Date: 1976-11-26
- Location: Memorial Stadium, Lincoln, Nebraska
- Game attendance: 76,247

Nebraska was outrushed on the day, lagging Oklahoma 185–357 on the ground and once again resorting to an air attack to stay in the game, yet the Cornhuskers were in the lead 17–13 when Oklahoma resorted to an unexpected air attack of their own to win. The Sooners had only thrown two passes in the last two games combined, but used two pass plays in the final minutes to pull out the surprise win. One pass, a 47-yarder from reserve Oklahoma HB Woodie Shepherd, was the first of his career, while the other was tossed by backup Oklahoma QB Dean Blevins 10 yards and then lateraled for an additional 22-yard gain. The Cornhuskers, felled by passes from a ground-based team they had not defeated since 1971, was knocked out of the Orange Bowl.

=== Hawaii ===
#13 Nebraska at Hawaii [box score]

Team	1	2	3	4	Total
• #13 Nebraska	27	6	21	14	68
Hawaii	0	0	3	0	3

- Date: 1976-12-04
- Location: Aloha Stadium, Honolulu, Hawaii
- Game attendance: 33,737

In a lightly attended Honolulu game with more Cornhusker fans in attendance than locals, Nebraska punished Hawaii with a 47–0 lead before allowing the Rainbows to obtain their lone points of the day on a field goal near the end of the 3rd quarter, which was answered by an additional 21 straight Cornhusker points to close the game. Nebraska's 655 yards of total offense was a new all-time school record, as was the 211 single game yards accumulated by IB Rick Berns, which succeeded the mark of 204 set by Frank Solich in 1965. Nebraska SE Chuck Malito's 166 receiving yards also set a new single game school record, and Nebraska QB Vince Ferragamo broke David Humm's 1972 season touchdown record of 18 when he pushed his season total to 20.

=== Texas Tech ===
#13 Nebraska at #9 Texas Tech [box score]

Team	1	2	3	4	Total
• #13 Nebraska	7	7	13	0	27
#9 Texas Tech	3	14	7	0	24

- Date: 1976-12-31
- Location: Astrodome, Houston, Texas
- Game attendance: 48,618

Nebraska was behind 17–14 at the half, and Texas Tech increased their lead shortly after the start of the 3rd when they posted another touchdown, and things were looking bleak for the Cornhuskers as the Red Raiders seemed to have an answer for everything Nebraska came up with. Then, two minutes later, Nebraska found the end zone to pull within 4 points, and after managing to force Texas Tech into a punt that was partially blocked, the Cornhuskers scored again two minutes later to take the lead, and held on for the win.

== Rankings ==
Ranking movements Legend: ██ Increase in ranking ██ Decrease in ranking
	Week													
Poll	Pre	1	2	3	4	5	6	7	8	9	10	11	12	Final
AP	1	8	6	5	6	3	3	9	9	9	12	10	13	9
Coaches														7

== Awards ==
Award	Name(s)
All-America 1st team	Dave Butterfield, Vince Ferragamo, Mike Fultz
All-America 2nd team	Clete Pillen
All-America honorable mention	Greg Jorgensen, Bob Lingenfelter, Ray Phillips, Ron Pruitt, Dan Schmidt
Big 8 Defensive Player of the Year	Clete Pillen
All-Big 8 1st team	Dave Butterfield, Vince Ferragamo, Mike Fultz, Bob Lingenfelter, Ray Phillips, Clete Pillen, Dan Schmidt
All-Big 8 2nd team	Al Eveland, Steve Hoins, Chuck Malito, Ron Pruitt, Ken Spaeth
All-Big 8 honorable mention	Tom Davis, Greg Jorgensen, Dave Shamblin, Bobby Thomas, Larry Valasek

=== NFL and pro players ===
The following Nebraska players who participated in the 1976 season later moved on to the next level and joined a professional or semi-pro team as draftees or free agents.

Name	Team
George Andrews	Los Angeles Rams
Bill Barnett	Miami Dolphins
Rick Berns	Tampa Bay Buccaneers
Ed Burns	New Orleans Saints
Kelvin Clark	Denver Broncos
Barney Cotton	Cincinnati Bengals
Tom Davis	Toronto Argonauts
Vince Ferragamo	Los Angeles Rams
Mike Fultz	New Orleans Saints
Mark Goodspeed	St. Louis Cardinals
Rod Horn	Cincinnati Bengals
Lee Kunz	Chicago Bears
Oudious Lee	St. Louis Cardinals
Bob Lingenfelter	Cleveland Browns
Ray Phillips	Cincinnati Bengals
Stan Waldemore	New York Jets
