= 1976–77 NCAA football bowl games =

Series of post-season NCAA football games

- Season: 1976
- Number of bowls: 12
- Bowl games: December 13, 1976 – January 2, 1977
- National Championship: 1977 Sugar Bowl
- Location of Championship: Louisiana Superdome, New Orleans, Louisiana
- Champions: Pittsburgh
Bowl record by conference
Conference	Bowls	Record	Final AP poll

The 1976–77 NCAA football bowl games were a series of post-season games played in December 1976 and January 1977 to end the 1976 NCAA Division I football season. A total of 12 team-competitive games were played. The post-season began with the Independence Bowl on December 13, 1976, and concluded on January 2, 1977, with the Sun Bowl.

== Schedule ==
Date	Game	Site	TV	Teams	Results
Dec. 13	Independence Bowl	State Fair Stadium; Shreveport, Louisiana	—	McNeese State (9–2); Tulsa (7–3–1)	McNeese State 20; Tulsa 16
Dec. 18	Tangerine Bowl	Orlando Stadium; Orlando, Florida	Mizlou	No. 14 Oklahoma State (8–3); BYU (9–2)	Oklahoma State 49; BYU 21
Dec. 20	Liberty Bowl	Liberty Bowl Memorial Stadium; Memphis, Tennessee	ABC	No. 16 Alabama (9–3); No. 7 UCLA (9–1–1)	Alabama 36; UCLA 6
Dec. 25	Fiesta Bowl	Sun Devil Stadium; Tempe, Arizona	CBS	No. 8 Oklahoma (8–2–1); Wyoming (8–3)	Oklahoma 41; Wyoming 7
Dec. 27	Gator Bowl	Gator Bowl Stadium; Jacksonville, Florida	ABC	No. 15 Notre Dame (8–3); No. 20 Penn State (7–4)	Notre Dame 20; Penn State 9
Dec. 31	Peach Bowl	Fulton County Stadium; Atlanta, Georgia	Mizlou	Kentucky (7–4); No. 19 North Carolina (9–2)	Kentucky 21; North Carolina 0
Dec. 31	Astro-Bluebonnet Bowl	Astrodome; Houston, Texas	TVS	No. 13 Nebraska (8–3–1); No. 9 Texas Tech (10–1)	Nebraska 27; Texas Tech 24
Jan. 1	Sugar Bowl	Louisiana Superdome; New Orleans, Louisiana	ABC	No. 1 Pittsburgh (11–0); No. 5 Georgia (10–1)	Pittsburgh 27; Georgia 3
Jan. 1	Cotton Bowl Classic	Cotton Bowl; Dallas, Texas	CBS	No. 6 Houston (9–2); No. 4 Maryland (11–0)	Houston 30; Maryland 21
Jan. 1	Rose Bowl	Rose Bowl; Pasadena, California	NBC	No. 3 USC (10–1); No. 2 Michigan (10–1)	USC 14; Michigan 6
Jan. 1	Orange Bowl	Miami Orange Bowl; Miami, Florida	NBC	No. 11 Ohio State (8–2–1); No. 12 Colorado (8–3)	Ohio State 27; Colorado 10
Jan. 2	Sun Bowl	Sun Bowl; El Paso, Texas	CBS	No. 20 Texas A&M (9–2); Florida (8–3)	Texas A&M 37; Florida 14

Rankings from AP Poll
