= 1976 Alabama Crimson Tide football team =

American college football season

1976 Alabama Crimson Tide football

Liberty Bowl champion

Liberty Bowl, W 36–6 vs. UCLA
- Conference: Southeastern Conference

Ranking
- Coaches: No. 9
- AP: No. 11
- Record: 9–3 (5–2 SEC)
- Head coach: Bear Bryant (19th season)
- Offensive coordinator: Mal Moore (2nd season)
- Offensive scheme: Wishbone
- Defensive coordinator: Ken Donahue (3rd season)
- Base defense: 5–2
- Captains: Thad Flanagan; Charley Hannah
- Home stadium: Bryant–Denny Stadium; Legion Field

1976 Southeastern Conference football standings
	Conf.					Overall
Team	W		L		T	W		L		T
No. 10 Georgia $	5	–	1	–	0	10	–	2	–	0
No. 11 Alabama	5	–	2	–	0	9	–	3	–	0
No. 20 Mississippi State	4	–	2	–	0	9	–	2	–	0
Florida	4	–	2	–	0	8	–	4	–	0
No. 18 Kentucky $	4	–	2	–	0	8	–	4	–	0
LSU	3	–	3	–	0	6	–	4	–	1
Auburn	3	–	3	–	0	4	–	7	–	0
Ole Miss	3	–	4	–	0	5	–	6	–	0
Tennessee	2	–	4	–	0	6	–	5	–	0
Vanderbilt	0	–	6	–	0	2	–	9	–	0
$ – Conference champion; Mississippi State later forfeited all 1976 wins due to NCAA violations. Kentucky retroactively announced in 1978 as SEC co-champion.; Rankings from AP Poll

The 1976 Alabama Crimson Tide football team (variously "Alabama", "UA" or "Bama") represented the University of Alabama in the 1976 NCAA Division I football season. It was the Crimson Tide's 82nd overall and 43rd season as a member of the Southeastern Conference (SEC). The team was led by head coach Bear Bryant, in his 19th year, and played their home games at Bryant–Denny Stadium in Tuscaloosa and Legion Field in Birmingham, Alabama. They finished season with nine wins and three losses (9–3 overall, 5–2 in the SEC) and with a victory over UCLA in the Liberty Bowl.

The Crimson Tide opened the season with an upset loss against Ole Miss. The loss ended a 20-game conference winning streak that dated back to their 1972 season. They rebounded from the loss with wins over both SMU and Vanderbilt, but then were shut out by Georgia in their fourth game. The shutout was the first for the Crimson Tide since their 1970 season, and with the loss Alabama also dropped out of the polls for the first time since 1970.

The Crimson Tide again bounced back from the loss and won their next five games. These wins included victories over Southern Miss, Tennessee, Louisville, Mississippi State and LSU. Alabama next lost their third game of the season in a much anticipated match-up at Notre Dame. They then closed the season with a victory over rival Auburn and UCLA in the Liberty Bowl.

== Schedule ==
Date	Opponent	Rank	Site	TV	Result	Attendance
September 11	at Ole Miss	No. 6	Mississippi Veterans Memorial Stadium; Jackson, MS (rivalry)		L 7–10	48,500
September 18	SMU*	No. 14	Legion Field; Birmingham, AL		W 56–3	63,203
September 25	Vanderbilt	No. 13	Bryant–Denny Stadium; Tuscaloosa, AL		W 42–14	58,414
October 2	at No. 6 Georgia	No. 10	Sanford Stadium; Athens, GA (rivalry)		L 0–21	60,200
October 9	Southern Miss*		Legion Field; Birmingham, AL		W 24–8	45,202
October 16	at Tennessee	No. 20	Neyland Stadium; Knoxville, TN (Third Saturday in October)	ABC	W 20–13	82,417
October 23	Louisville*^{†}	No. 18	Bryant–Denny Stadium; Tuscaloosa, AL		W 24–3	58,414
October 30	No. 18 Mississippi State	No. 17	Bryant–Denny Stadium; Tuscaloosa, AL (rivalry)		W 34–17	53,617
November 6	LSU	No. 15	Legion Field; Birmingham, AL (rivalry)		W 28–17	71,018
November 13	at No. 18 Notre Dame*	No. 10	Notre Dame Stadium; Notre Dame, IN	ABC	L 18–21	59,075
November 27	vs. Auburn	No. 18	Legion Field; Birmingham, AL (Iron Bowl)		W 38–7	70,303
December 20	vs. No. 7 UCLA*	No. 16	Liberty Bowl Memorial Stadium; Memphis, TN (Liberty Bowl)	ABC	W 36–6	52,736
*Non-conference game; ^{†}Homecoming; Rankings from AP Poll released prior to the game

== Stadium renaming ==
In September 1975, a bill sponsored by Alabama State Senator Bert Bank (the executive producer of Alabama's radio broadcasts) was passed by a margin of 88–0 to rename Denny Stadium to Bryant–Denny Stadium in honor of then head coach Bear Bryant. The stadium was then officially renamed as part of the halftime ceremonies during the 1976 A-Day game. At the time of its re-dedication, Bryant was quoted as saying "this is a tremendous honor and I am proud and humble."

== Game summaries ==
=== Ole Miss ===
Team	1	2	3	4	Total
#6 Alabama	0	0	7	0	7
• Ole Miss	7	0	0	3	10

- Date: September 11
- Location: Veterans Memorial Stadium
  Jackson, MS
- Game attendance: 48,500

Scoring summary
1	Ole Miss	George Stuart 24-yard interception return (Carl Langley kick)	Ole Miss 7–0
3	Alabama	Calvin Culliver 3-yard run (Bucky Berrey kick)	7–7
4	Ole Miss	Carl Langley 34-yard field goal	Ole Miss 10–7

As they entered the 1976 season, the Crimson Tide were in the No. 6 position in the AP Poll prior to their game against Ole Miss at Jackson. Against the Rebels, the Crimson Tide were upset by a final score of 10–7 that ended an overall eleven game winning streak and a 20-game conference winning streak that dated back to their 1972 season. Ole Miss scored their first points early in the game when George Stuart intercepted a Jeff Rutledge pass that was tipped by Gary Turner and returned it 24-yards for a 7–0 lead. The Rebels held their lead through the third quarter when Alabama tied the game 7–7 on a three-yard Calvin Culliver touchdown run.

Ole Miss then responded early in the fourth with what was a 34-yard, game-winning field goal from Carl Langley that made the final score 10–7. For leading his team to the upset, Ole Miss head coach Ken Cooper was recognized by United Press International as the UPI National Coach of the Week.

=== SMU ===
Team	1	2	3	4	Total
SMU	3	0	0	0	3
• #14 Alabama	0	28	14	14	56

- Date: September 18
- Location: Legion Field
  Birmingham, AL
- Game attendance: 63,203

Scoring summary
1	SMU	John Dunlop 40-yard field goal	SMU 3–0
2	Alabama	Jack O'Rear 7-yard run (Bucky Berrey kick)	Alabama 7–3
2	Alabama	Jack O'Rear 19-yard run (Bucky Berrey kick)	Alabama 14–3
2	Alabama	Tony Nathan 6-yard run (Bucky Berrey kick)	Alabama 21–3
2	Alabama	Ozzie Newsome 45-yard pass from Jeff Rutledge (Bucky Berrey kick)	Alabama 28–3
3	Alabama	Johnny Davis 17-yard run (Bucky Berrey kick)	Alabama 35–3
3	Alabama	Tony Nathan 7-yard run (Bucky Berrey kick)	Alabama 42–3
4	Alabama	Lou Ikner 11-yard run (Bucky Berrey kick)	Alabama 49–3
4	Alabama	Donald Faust 3-yard run (Bucky Berrey kick)	Alabama 56–3

After their loss against Ole Miss, the Crimson Tide dropped into the No. 14 team prior to their game against Southern Methodist University (SMU). At Legion Field, Alabama ran for 419 yards and eight touchdowns in this 56–3 victory over the Mustangs in what was the first all-time meeting between the schools. The Crimson Tide had a slow start to the game offensively, and trailed 3–0 at the end of the first quarter behind a 40-yard John Dunlop field goal for SMU. However, they responded with four touchdowns in the second quarter en route to a 28–3 halftime lead after backup quarterback Jack O'Rear took over for Jeff Rutledge after the Crimson Tide offense had three turnovers on their first three possessions. O'Rear scored first on runs of seven and 19-yards, followed by Tony Nathan on a six-yard run and finally by Rutledge on a 45-yard pass to Ozzie Newsome.

Their scoring continued into the second half with a pair of touchdowns scored in each the third and fourth quarters. In the third, Johnny Davis scored on a 17-yard run and Nathan followed with his second touchdown of the game on a seven-yard run. In the fourth Lou Ikner scored first on an 11-yard run and Donald Faust made the final score 56–3 with his three-yard run late in the game. For the game, 65 players saw action on the field and Nathan led all runners with his 101 yards rushing.

=== Vanderbilt ===
Team	1	2	3	4	Total
Vanderbilt	0	7	7	0	14
• #13 Alabama	21	7	7	7	42

- Date: September 25
- Location: Bryant–Denny Stadium
  Tuscaloosa, AL
- Game attendance: 58,414

Scoring summary
1	Alabama	Jack O'Rear 52-yard run (Bucky Berrey kick)	Alabama 7–0
1	Alabama	Johnny Davis 8-yard run (Bucky Berrey kick)	Alabama 14–0
1	Alabama	Johnny Davis 8-yard run (Bucky Berrey kick)	Alabama 21–0
2	Alabama	Ozzie Newsome 27-yard pass from Jeff Rutledge (Bucky Berrey kick)	Alabama 28–0
2	Vanderbilt	Jerry Hampton 5-yard run (Gregory Martin kick)	Alabama 28–7
3	Alabama	Calvin Culliver 2-yard run (Bucky Berrey kick)	Alabama 35–7
3	Vanderbilt	James Cox 43-yard pass from Jerry Hampton (Gregory Martin kick)	Alabama 35–14
4	Alabama	Peter Cavan 9-yard pass from Jeff Rutledge (Bucky Berrey kick)	Alabama 42–14

After their victory over SMU, Alabama moved into the No. 13 position in the AP Poll prior to their game against Vanderbilt. In their first Bryant–Denny game of the season, the Crimson Tide scored 21 first quarter points en route to a 42–14 victory over the Commodores at Tuscaloosa. Jack O'Rear scored first for Alabama with this 52-yard run. Johnny Davis followed with a pair of eight-yard touchdown runs that gave Alabama a 21–0 lead at the end of the first quarter. After Jeff Rutledge extended the Crimson Tide lead to 28–0 with his 27-yard touchdown pass to Ozzie Newsome, Vanderbilt made the halftime score 28–7 on a five-yard Jerry Hampton touchdown run.

In the third, the Crimson Tide scored first on a two-yard Calvin Culliver touchdown run. However, the Commodores responded with their longest offensive play of the game when Hampton connected with James Cox on a 43-yard touchdown pass and made the score 35–14. Alabama then made the final score 42–14 with a nine-yard Peter Cavan touchdown reception from Rutledge in the fourth quarter.

=== Georgia ===
Team	1	2	3	4	Total
#10 Alabama	0	0	0	0	0
• #6 Georgia	0	7	7	7	21

- Date: October 2
- Location: Sanford Stadium
  Athens, GA
- Game attendance: 60,200

Scoring summary
2	Georgia	Matt Robinson 3-yard run (Allan Leavitt kick)	Georgia 7–0
3	Georgia	Rayfield Williams 2-yard run (Allan Leavitt kick)	Georgia 14–0
4	Georgia	Ulysses Norris 6-yard pass from Matt Robinson (Allan Leavitt kick)	Georgia 21–0

After their victory over Vanderbilt, Alabama moved into the No. 10 position and Georgia into the No. 6 position in the AP Poll prior to their game at Athens. Playing against the Bulldogs for the first time since their 1973 season, Georgia shut out the Crimson Tide, 21–0, and with the victory prevented Alabama from capturing its sixth consecutive SEC title. After a scoreless first quarter, Matt Robinson gave Georgia a 7–0 halftime lead with his three-yard touchdown run. The Bulldogs then closed the game with a two-yard Rayfield Williams touchdown run in the third and a six-yard Robinson touchdown pass to Ulysses Norris in the fourth for the 21–0 victory.

The shutout was the first suffered by the Crimson Tide since a 24–0 loss against Tennessee in 1970, and was also the first for Alabama since the installation of the wishbone offense starting with their 1971 season.

=== Southern Miss ===
Team	1	2	3	4	Total
Southern Miss	0	0	0	8	8
• Alabama	14	7	0	3	24

- Date: October 9
- Location: Legion Field
  Birmingham, AL
- Game attendance: 45,202

Scoring summary
1	Alabama	Peter Cavan 26-yard run (Bucky Berrey kick)	Alabama 7–0
1	Alabama	John David Crow, Jr. 6-yard run (Bucky Berrey kick)	Alabama 14–0
2	Alabama	Ozzie Newsome 4-yard pass from Jeff Rutledge (Bucky Berrey kick)	Alabama 21–0
4	Alabama	Bucky Berrey 27-yard field goal	Alabama 24–0
4	USM	John Pitts 4-yard pass from Charles Clancy (Clancy 2-point pass)	Alabama 24–8

After their loss to Georgia, Alabama dropped out of the AP Poll prior to their game against Southern Miss for the first time since their 1970 season. Before one of the smaller crowds to attend a Crimson Tide game at Legion Field in many decades, Alabama defeated the Golden Eagles 24–8. The Crimson Tide took a 14–0 first quarter lead behind touchdown runs of 26 and six-yards by Peter Cavan and John David Crow Jr. They extended it further to 21–0 at halftime after Jeff Rutledge threw a four-yard touchdown pass to Ozzie Newsome in the second quarter.

After a scoreless third, Bucky Berrey connected on a 27-yard field goal early in the fourth. Southern Miss then responded with their only points on a four-yard Charles Clancy touchdown pass to John Pitts that made the final score 24–8.

=== Tennessee ===
Third Saturday in October

Team	1	2	3	4	Total
• #20 Alabama	6	0	7	7	20
Tennessee	0	6	7	0	13

- Date: October 16
- Location: Neyland Stadium
  Knoxville, TN
- Game attendance: 82,417

Scoring summary
1	Alabama	Tony Nathan 11-yard run (Bucky Berrey kick failed)	Alabama 6–0
2	Tennessee	Jim Gaylor 24-yard field goal	Alabama 6–3
2	Tennessee	Jim Gaylor 40-yard field goal	6–6
3	Alabama	Jack O'Rear 14-yard run (Bucky Berrey kick)	Alabama 13–6
3	Tennessee	Bobby Emmons 2-yard run (Jim Gaylor kick)	13–13
4	Alabama	Calvin Culliver 7-yard run (Bucky Berrey kick)	Alabama 20–13

After their victory over Southern Miss, Alabama reentered the AP Poll at the No. 20 position prior to their game against Tennessee. Before a nationally televised audience, the Crimson Tide defeated the heated rival Volunteers 20–13 at Neyland Stadium. Alabama took a 6–0 first quarter lead behind an 11-yard Tony Nathan touchdown run. Tennessee responded and tied the game 6–6 at halftime behind Jim Gaylor field goals of 24 and 40-yards in the second quarter.

In the third, both teams traded touchdowns on runs of 14 yards by Jack O'Rear for Alabama and 2 yards by Bobby Emmons for Tennessee that made the score as they entered the fourth tied 13–13. In the fourth, Calvin Culliver scored the game-winning points with this seven-yard touchdown run that made the final score 20–13.

=== Louisville ===
Team	1	2	3	4	Total
Louisville	0	3	0	0	3
• #18 Alabama	0	14	10	0	24

- Date: October 23
- Location: Bryant–Denny Stadium
  Tuscaloosa, AL
- Game attendance: 58,414

Scoring summary
2	Alabama	Tony Nathan 10-yard run (Bucky Berrey kick)	Alabama 7–0
2	Alabama	Johnny Davis 12-yard run (Bucky Berrey kick)	Alabama 14–0
2	Louisville	Pedro Posadas 46-yard field goal	Alabama 14–3
3	Alabama	Jack O'Rear 14-yard run (Bucky Berrey kick)	Alabama 21–3
3	Alabama	Bucky Berrey 27-yard field goal	Alabama 24–3

After their win over Tennessee, Alabama moved into the No. 18 position of the AP Poll prior to their game against Louisville. On homecoming in Tuscaloosa, Alabama defeated the Cardinals 24–3 in what was the first all-time meeting between the schools. After a scoreless first, Alabama took a 14–0 lead behind touchdown runs of ten-yards by Tony Nathan and 12-yards by Johnny Davis. Louisville responded late in the quarter with their only points of the game on a 46-yard Pedro Posadas field goal that made the halftime score 14–3. The Crimson Tide then concluded their scoring in the third on a 14-yard Jack O'Rear touchdown run and a 27-yard Bucky Berrey field goal.

=== Mississippi State ===
Team	1	2	3	4	Total
#18 Mississippi State	14	3	0	0	17
• #17 Alabama	0	12	15	7	34

- Date: October 30
- Location: Bryant–Denny Stadium
  Tuscaloosa, AL
- Game attendance: 53,617

Scoring summary
1	MS State	Duncan McKenzie 16-yard pass from Bruce Threadgill (Kinney Jordan kick)	MS State 7–0
1	MS State	Bruce Threadgill 12-yard run (Kinney Jordan kick)	MS State 14–0
2	Alabama	Ozzie Newsome 62-yard pass from Jeff Rutledge (2-point pass failed)	MS State 14–6
2	MS State	Kinney Jordan 22-yard field goal	MS State 17–6
2	Alabama	Bucky Berrey 43-yard field goal	MS State 17–9
2	Alabama	Bucky Berrey 25-yard field goal	MS State 17–12
3	Alabama	Johnny Davis 27-yard run (2-point run)	Alabama 20–17
3	Alabama	Pete Cavan 25-yard run (Bucky Berrey kick)	Alabama 27–17
4	Alabama	Tony Nathan 4-yard run (Bucky Berrey kick)	Alabama 34–17

As they entered their game against Mississippi State, Alabama moved into the No. 17 position and the Bulldogs into the No. 18 position in the AP Poll. At Tuscaloosa, the Crimson Tide overcame a 14–0 deficit, came-from-behind and defeated Mississippi State 34–17. Behind quarterback Bruce Threadgill, the Bulldogs took a 14–0 first quarter lead over the Crimson Tide. Threadgill first threw a 16-yard touchdown pass to Duncan McKenzie and later scored himself on a 12-yard touchdown run.

Alabama scored their first points early in the second quarter on a 62-yard Jeff Rutledge touchdown pass to Ozzie Newsome. Both teams then traded field goals to close the half with Kinney Jordan connecting from 22-yards for the Bulldogs and Bucky Berrey connecting from 43 and 25-yards for the Crimson Tide to make the halftime score 17–12 in favor of Mississippi State.

Alabama took their first lead early in the third quarter on a 27-yard Johnny Davis touchdown run and extended it further to 27–17 later in the quarter on a 25-yard Pete Cavan touchdown run. Tony Nathan then concluded the scoring for the Crimson Tide with his four-yard touchdown run in the fourth that made the final score 34–17.

=== LSU ===
Team	1	2	3	4	Total
LSU	0	3	7	7	17
• #15 Alabama	0	14	7	7	28

- Date: November 6
- Location: Legion Field
  Birmingham, AL
- Game attendance: 71,018

Scoring summary
2	LSU	Mike Conway 48-yard field goal	LSU 3–0
2	Alabama	Pete Cavan 7-yard run (Bucky Berrey kick)	Alabama 7–3
2	Alabama	Jeff Rutledge 9-yard run (Bucky Berrey kick)	Alabama 14–3
3	Alabama	Johnny Davis 13-yard run (Bucky Berrey kick)	Alabama 21–3
3	LSU	Pat Lyons 1-yard run (Mike Conway kick)	Alabama 21–10
4	Alabama	Johnny Davis 58-yard run (Bucky Berrey kick)	Alabama 28–10
4	LSU	Terry Robiskie 6-yard run (Mike Conway kick)	Alabama 28–17

After their victory over Mississippi State, Alabama moved into the No. 15 position in the AP Poll prior to their game against LSU. Against the rival Tigers, Alabama won 28–17--in a game not as close as the final score--behind a 130-yard, two touchdown performance by fullback Johnny Davis. After a scoreless first quarter, LSU took a 3–0 lead in the second on a 48-yard Mike Conway field goal. Alabama responded with a pair of touchdowns on runs of seven-yards by Pete Cavan and nine-yards by Jeff Rutledge en route to a 14–3 halftime lead.

The Crimson Tide then maintained their lead through the second half as the teams traded touchdowns. In the third, Johnny Davis scored for the Crimson Tide with his 13-yard run and Pat Lyons scored for the Tigers with this one-yard run. In the fourth Davis scored again for Alabama on a 58-yard run and Terry Robiskie scored on a six-yard run that made the final score 28–17 in favor of the Crimson Tide.

This was the fifth of seven consecutive Alabama wins over LSU by at least 11 points, and the sixth of 11 straight wins overall in the series.

=== Notre Dame ===
Team	1	2	3	4	Total
#10 Alabama	0	7	3	8	18
• #18 Notre Dame	0	21	0	0	21

- Date: November 13
- Location: Notre Dame Stadium
  South Bend, IN
- Game attendance: 59,075

Scoring summary
2	Notre Dame	Dan Kelleher 56-yard pass from Rick Slager (Dave Reeve kick)	Notre Dame 7–0
2	Notre Dame	Al Hunter 2-yard run (Dave Reeve kick)	Notre Dame 14–0
2	Alabama	Jack O'Rear 1-yard run (Bucky Berrey kick)	Notre Dame 14–7
2	Notre Dame	Vagas Ferguson 17-yard run (Dave Reeve kick)	Notre Dame 21–7
3	Alabama	Bucky Berrey 38-yard field goal	Notre Dame 21–10
4	Alabama	Ozzie Newsome 30-yard pass from Jeff Rutledge (2-point run good)	Notre Dame 21–18

After their victory over LSU, Alabama moved into the No. 10 position and Notre Dame into the No. 18 position in the AP Poll prior to their game at South Bend. In what was their first regular-season game against the Fighting Irish, Alabama was upset 21–18 after Notre Dame scored three second quarter touchdowns. The first quarter was scoreless, although Notre Dame missed on two golden scoring opportunities—one on a missed field goal, the other when freshman running back Vagas Ferguson's fumble in the end zone was recovered by Alabama for a touchback. The Irish took a 14–0 lead in the second quarter behind a 56-yard Rick Slager touchdown pass to Dan Kelleher and a two-yard Al Hunter touchdown run. Alabama responded with a one-yard Jack O'Rear touchdown run, but that was followed with a 17-yard Ferguson touchdown run that made the halftime score 21–7 in favor of Notre Dame. The Irish gained a stunning 366 yards in the first half, to 166 for Alabama.

Although the Crimson Tide defense shutout the Irish in the second half, the offense was only able to score 11 points and lost 21–18. Alabama points were scored in the third on a 38-yard Bucky Berrey field goal and in the fourth on a 30-yard Jeff Rutledge touchdown pass to Ozzie Newsome.

=== Auburn ===
Iron Bowl

Team	1	2	3	4	Total
Auburn	0	0	0	7	7
• #18 Alabama	0	14	21	3	38

- Date: November 27
- Location: Legion Field
  Birmingham, AL
- Game attendance: 70,303

Scoring summary
2	Alabama	Rick Watson 1-yard run (Bucky Berrey kick)	Alabama 7–0
2	Alabama	Tony Nathan 14-yard run (Bucky Berrey kick)	Alabama 14–0
3	Alabama	Ozzie Newsome 42-yard pass from Jeff Rutledge (Bucky Berrey kick)	Alabama 21–0
3	Alabama	Tony Nathan 10-yard run (Bucky Berrey kick)	Alabama 28–0
3	Alabama	Jeff Rutledge 11-yard run (Bucky Berrey kick)	Alabama 35–0
4	Alabama	Bucky Berrey 47-yard field goal	Alabama 38–0
4	Auburn	Foster Christy 1-yard run (Neil O'Donoghue kick)	Alabama 38–7

As they entered the annual Iron Bowl, Alabama dropped into the No. 18 position in the AP Poll prior to their match-up at Legion Field against Auburn. In what was the first game coached by Doug Barfield as the head coach of the Tigers, the Crimson Tide were victorious with this 38–7 win at Birmingham. After a scoreless first, Alabama took a 14–0 lead into halftime after second quarter touchdowns were scored on runs of one-yard by Rick Watson and 14-yard by Tony Nathan.

The Crimson Tide extended their lead to 35–0 with a trio of touchdowns in the third quarter. They were scored on a 42-yard Jeff Rutledge pass to Ozzie Newsome, a 14-yard Nathan run and on an 11-yard Rutledge run. A 47-yard Bucky Berrey field goal in the fourth extended the Alabama lead to 38–0. Auburn did manage to score late an prevent the shutout on a one-yard Foster Christy touchdown run late in the game.

=== UCLA ===
Liberty Bowl

Team	1	2	3	4	Total
• #16 Alabama	17	7	3	9	36
#7 UCLA	0	0	0	6	6

- Date: December 20
- Location: Liberty Bowl Memorial Stadium
  Memphis, TN
- Game attendance: 52,736
- Television network: ABC

Scoring summary
1	Alabama	Bucky Berrey 37-yard field goal	Alabama 3–0
1	Alabama	Barry Krauss 44-yard interception return (Bucky Berrey kick)	Alabama 10–0
1	Alabama	Johnny Davis 2-yard run (Bucky Berrey kick)	Alabama 17–0
2	Alabama	Jack O'Rear 20-yard pass from Tony Nathan (Bucky Berrey kick)	Alabama 24–0
3	Alabama	Bucky Berrey 25-yard field goal	Alabama 27–0
4	Alabama	Bucky Berrey 28-yard field goal	Alabama 30–0
4	UCLA	Jim Brown 61-yard run (Kick failed)	Alabama 30–6
4	Alabama	Rick Watson 1-yard run (2-point pass failed)	Alabama 36–6

Playing before the then-largest crowd to ever attend the Liberty Bowl, Alabama stunned the once-beaten UCLA Bruins 36–6 at Memphis in the first all-time meeting between the schools. Alabama took a 17–0 first quarter lead on a 37-yard Bucky Berrey field goal, a 44-yard Barry Krauss interception return and a two-yard Johnny Davis touchdown run. They then extended their lead to 24–0 at halftime on a second quarter halfback option play of 20-yards from Tony Nathan to Jack O'Rear. After a pair of Berrey field goals extended the Crimson Tide lead to 30–0, UCLA scored their only points in a 61-yard Jim Brown run in the fourth. Rick Watson then scored the final points of the game for Alabama with his one-yard touchdown run that made the final score 36–6.

== Roster ==
1976 Alabama Crimson Tide football team roster
Players
Coaches
Offense

Pos.	#	Name	Class
TE		Buddy Aydelette	So
HB		Jeff Barnes	So
OT		Wiley Barnes	So
G		Bo Batey	Sr
SE	32	Bruce Bolton	So
HB		Randy Bonner	So
G	63	Vince Booth	So
OT		Jim Bradford	Jr
FB		Woody Buchanan	Jr
HB		Pete Cavan	Jr
HB		John David Crowe, Jr.	Jr
G		Bob Cryder	Jr
FB	33	Calvin Culliver	Sr
FB	38	Johnny Davis	Jr
G		Fred Dawson	Jr
FB		Donnie Faust	Jr
SE	87	Thad Flanagan	Sr
G		David Gerasimchuk	Sr
G		Louis Green	Jr
HB		John Gunnels	Jr
OT		David Hannah	So
TE		Bill Henderson	Jr
SE		Steve Higgins	So
C		Marty Hudson	So
C	55	Tom Hufstetler	So
OT		Tim Hurst	Jr
HB	30	Lou Ikner	So
QB	12	Kevin Jones	So
C	59	Terry Jones	Jr
HB		John LaBue	Sr
G		Buford Lambert	Sr
TE		Jeff Lamon	So
OT		K. J. Lazenby	Sr
TE		Sam Maddox	Jr
TE		Jimmy McArthur	Jr
OT		Ralph McElreath	Sr
G		David McIntyre	Sr
SE	82	Ozzie Newsome	Jr
QB	15	Jack O'Rear	Jr
C		Gary Oser	Jr
G		Tom Parkerson	So
QB		Skip Ramsey	So
QB	11	Jeff Rutledge	So
SE		Russ Schamun	Sr
OT	71	Mike Sebastian	So
C		Sid Smith	Sr
HB	26	Mike Sutton	Jr
OT		Chip Tillman	Sr
HB		John Turpin	So
G		Russ Waddell	Jr
QB		Bob Walker	So
FB		Rick Watson	Sr
QB		Marty White	So

Defense

Pos.	#	Name	Class
DB	34	Phil Allman	So
DT	91	Bob Baumhower	Sr
LB		Dale Bragan	Sr
LB		Neil Callaway	Sr
DE	85	Danny Collins	Jr
DB		Kelvin Croom	So
DB		Allen Crumbley	So
DT		Jack Perdue	So
LB		Mike Dottorey	So
S		Robert Durkee	So
S		Les Fowler	Jr
DE		Robert Gartman	So
DE	92	Rickey Gilliand	So
DB		Andy Gothard	Sr
DT		Charley Hannah	Sr
DE		Paul Harris	Sr
DT		Bill Harrison	Sr
DE		Bruce Hodges	Jr
LB		Colenzo Hubbard	Sr
DE		Doug Johnson	So
DT		Larry Knighton	So
NG		Freddy Knighton	So
DB	23	Mike Kramer	Jr
LB	77	Barry Krauss	So
S		Joe Latham	So
S	19	Murray Legg	So
DT	93	Marty Lyons	So
DE		Bobby Mikel	So
LB		Dale Palmer	So
DE	89	Calvin Parker	So
DB		Scott Price	So
S	4	Keith Pugh	So
DT		Roger Roberts	So
NG	62	David Sadler	Jr
DB		Eric Schamun	Jr
LB	65	Jack Smalley	Jr
S	52	Barry Smith	So
DB	21	Mike Tucker	Sr
LB		Gus White	Sr
DE	45	Steve Whitman	So
LB	36	Rich Wingo	So

Special teams

Pos.	#	Name	Class
PK	7	Bucky Berrey	Sr
PK	6	Alan McElroy	So

Head coach

- Bear Bryant (19th year, Alabama)

Coordinators/assistant coaches

- Paul Crane (3rd year, Alabama)
- Sylvester Croom (1st year, Alabama)
- Ken Donahue (13th year, Tennessee)
- Clem Gryska (17th year, Alabama)
- Curley Hallman (4th year, Texas A&M)
- Dude Hennessey (17th year, Kentucky)
- Bobby Marks (5th year, Texas A&M)
- John Mitchell (4th year, Alabama)
- Mal Moore (13th year, Alabama)
- Bill Oliver (6th year, Alabama)
- Dee Powell (13th year, Texas )
- Jeff Rouzie (1st year, Alabama)
- Jack Rutledge (11th year, Alabama)
- George White (2nd year, Jacksonville State)

Legend

- (C) Team captain
- (S) Suspended
- (I) Ineligible
- Injured
- Redshirt

Roster
Last update: September 1, 2014

== NFL draft ==
Several players that were varsity lettermen from the 1976 squad were drafted into the National Football League (NFL) in the 1977, 1978 and 1979 drafts. These players included:

Year	Round	Overall	Player name	Position	NFL team
1977 NFL draft	2	40	Bob Baumhower	Nose tackle	Miami Dolphins
1977 NFL draft	3	57	Charley Hannah	Offensive guard	Tampa Bay Buccaneers
1977 NFL draft	6	159	Paul Harris	Linebacker	Pittsburgh Steelers
1977 NFL draft	8	212	Calvin Culliver	Running back	Denver Broncos
1978 NFL draft	1	18	Bob Cryder	Guard	New England Patriots
1978 NFL draft	1	23	Ozzie Newsome	Tight end	Cleveland Browns
1978 NFL draft	2	30	Johnny Davis	Running back	Tampa Bay Buccaneers
1978 NFL draft	11	284	Terry Jones	Nose tackle	Green Bay Packers
1979 NFL draft	1	6	Barry Krauss	Linebacker	Baltimore Colts
1979 NFL draft	1	14	Marty Lyons	Defensive tackle	New York Jets
1979 NFL draft	3	61	Tony Nathan	Running back	Miami Dolphins
1979 NFL draft	7	184	Rich Wingo	Linebacker	Green Bay Packers
1979 NFL draft	9	246	Jeff Rutledge	Quarterback	Los Angeles Rams
