= 1976 Liberty Bowl =

American college football game

- 18th Liberty Bowl
| Alabama Crimson Tide | UCLA Bruins |
| (9–3) | (9–1–1) |
| SEC | Pac-8 |
| 36 | 6 |
| Head coach: Bear Bryant | Head coach: Terry Donahue |
| AP / Coaches; 16 / 15 | AP / Coaches; 7 / 6 |
| | 1 | 2 | 3 | 4 | Total |
|---|---|---|---|---|---|
| Alabama | 17 | 7 | 3 | 9 | 36 |
| UCLA | 0 | 0 | 0 | 6 | 6 |
- Date: December 20, 1976
- Season: 1976
- Stadium: Liberty Bowl Memorial Stadium
- Location: Memphis, Tennessee
- MVP: Barry Krauss, Alabama LB
- Attendance: 52,736

United States TV coverage
- Network: ABC
- Announcers: Keith Jackson and Ara Parseghian

The 1976 Liberty Bowl, part of the 1976 bowl game season, took place on December 20, 1976, at Liberty Bowl Memorial Stadium in Memphis, Tennessee. The competing teams in the 18th edition of the Liberty Bowl were the Alabama Crimson Tide, representing the Southeastern Conference (SEC), and the UCLA Bruins, representing the Pacific-8 Conference (Pac-8). Alabama won the game, 36–6.

== Teams ==
=== Alabama ===
The 1976 Alabama squad finished the regular season with a 9–3 record. The Crimson Tide opened the season ranked #6 only to lose to Ole Miss in their opening game, to eventual conference champion Georgia and to Notre Dame. Following their victory over Auburn, Alabama accepted an invitation to play in the Liberty Bowl. The appearance marked the third for Alabama in the Liberty Bowl, and their 30th overall bowl game appearance.

=== UCLA ===
Entering their final regular-season game against rival USC, the Bruins were ranked #2 with their only blemish on the season coming in a tie against Ohio State. With a berth in the Rose Bowl Game at stake, UCLA was upset 24–14 resulting in the Bruins accepting a bid to play in the Liberty Bowl. The appearance marked the first for UCLA in the Liberty Bowl, and both their 8th overall bowl game and their first away from the Rose Bowl. (the Pacific-8 repealed its "Rose Bowl or no bowl" rule in 1975).

== Game summary ==
After forcing a UCLA punt on the opening possession, Alabama took a 3–0 lead on a 37-yard Bucky Berrey field goal on their first offensive possession. On the ensuing UCLA drive, Bama linebacker Barry Krauss intercepted a Jeff Dankworth pass and returned it 44-yards for a touchdown. The following kickoff was fumbled by Wally Henry of UCLA with Alabama recovering. Five plays later Johnny Davis scored on a run from two yards out and the Crimson Tide were up 17–0 after the first quarter. The only points of the second quarter came on an Alabama trick play. Jack O'Rear took the snap and tossed the ball to halfback Tony Nathan who proceeded to pass it back to O'Rear who made the reception and took it 20 yards for a touchdown and a 24–0 lead. Alabama extended their lead to 30–0 with a pair of Berrey field goals before UCLA got on the scoreboard. Theotis Brown scored the Bruins' only points on a 61-yard touchdown run. Alabama responded with their final points with only 22 seconds remaining in the game on a 1-yard Rick Watson run making the final score 36–6.

Scoring summary

| Quarter | Time | Drive | | | Team | Scoring information | Score | |
| Quarter | Time | Plays | Yards | TOP | Team | Scoring information | Alabama | UCLA |
|---|---|---|---|---|---|---|---|---|
| 1 | | | | | Alabama | 37-yard field goal by Bucky Berrey | 3 | 0 |
| 1 | 3:39 | | | | Alabama | Interception returned 44 yards for touchdown by Barry Krauss, Bucky Berrey kick good | 10 | 0 |
| 1 | 1:42 | 5 | 31 | 1:57 | Alabama | Johnny Davis 2-yard touchdown run, Bucky Berrey kick good | 17 | 0 |
| 2 | | 7 | 64 | | Alabama | Jack O'Rear 20-yard touchdown reception from Tony Nathan, Bucky Berrey kick good | 24 | 0 |
| 3 | | | 41 | | Alabama | 25-yard field goal by Bucky Berrey | 27 | 0 |
| 4 | | | | | Alabama | 28-yard field goal by Bucky Berrey | 30 | 0 |
| 4 | | 6 | 86 | | UCLA | Theotis Brown 61-yard touchdown run, Frank Corral kick no good | 30 | 6 |
| 4 | 0:22 | | 72 | | Alabama | Rick Watson 1-yard touchdown run, Bucky Berrey kick no good | 36 | 6 |
| "TOP" = time of possession. For other American football terms, see Glossary of American football. | | | | | | | 36 | 6 |

== Aftermath ==
Alabama played in five consecutive New Year's Day bowl games following its Liberty Bowl rout of UCLA. The Crimson Tide won national championships in 1978 and 1979 with Sugar Bowl victories over Penn State and Arkansas, respectively.

The Tide returned to the Liberty Bowl in 1982 in what turned out to be the final game of Bear Bryant's coaching career. Alabama defeated Illinois 21-15 for Bryant's 232nd victory at his alma mater and 323rd overall. Bryant died of a massive heart attack in Tuscaloosa on January 26, 1983, at age 69, 28 days after coaching his last game.

UCLA has yet to return to the Liberty Bowl. The Pacific-8 Conference, which became the Pacific-10 in 1978 with the addition of Arizona and Arizona State, did not send another team to the Liberty Bowl until 1995, when Stanford lost to East Carolina.

Alabama and UCLA played a home-and-home series in 2000 at the Rose Bowl and 2001 at Bryant-Denny Stadium. The Bruins won both contests.
