= 1977 Sugar Bowl =

American college football game

- 43rd Sugar Bowl
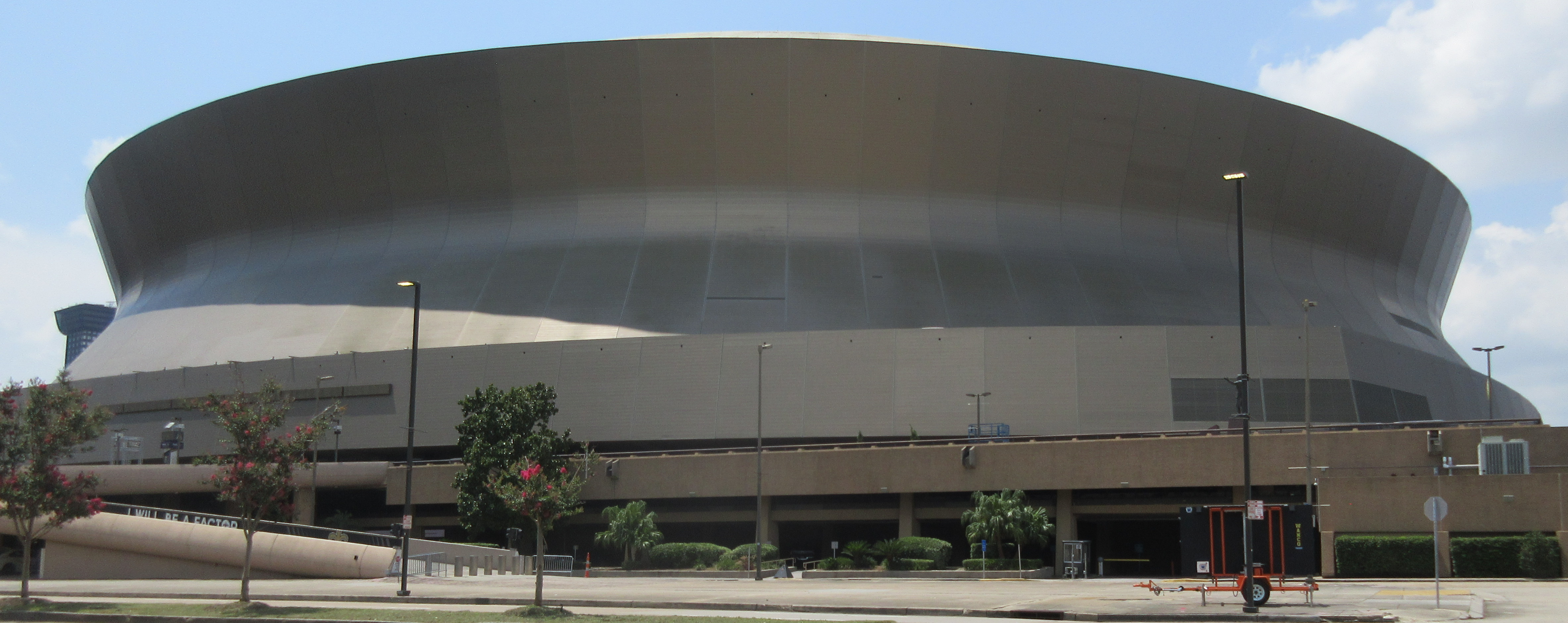
- The Louisiana Superdome in New Orleans, Louisiana, hosted the Sugar Bowl.
Pittsburgh Panthers	Georgia Bulldogs
(11–0)	(10–1)
Independent	SEC
27	3
Head coach: Johnny Majors	Head coach: Vince Dooley
AP / Coaches; 1 / 1	AP / Coaches; 5 / 4
	1	2	3	4	Total
Pittsburgh	7	14	3	3	27
Georgia	0	0	3	0	3
- Date: January 1, 1977
- Season: 1976
- Stadium: Louisiana Superdome
- Location: New Orleans, Louisiana
- MVP: Matt Cavanaugh (Pittsburgh QB)
- Favorite: Pittsburgh by 3 points
- Referee: Vincent Buckley (SWC)
- Attendance: 76,117

United States TV coverage
- Network: ABC
- Announcers: Keith Jackson, Ara Parseghian

The 1977 Sugar Bowl was the 43rd edition of the college football bowl game, played at the Louisiana Superdome in New Orleans, Louisiana, on Saturday, January 1. Part of the 1976–77 bowl game season, it matched the top-ranked Pittsburgh Panthers and the #5 Georgia Bulldogs, champions of the Southeastern Conference (SEC). Independent Pittsburgh won 27–3, and were consensus national champions.

After four years (1972–1975) as a New Year's Eve contest, the Sugar Bowl returned to New Year's Day this year. This was the first edition with a formal tie-in with the SEC champion; the initial three-year deal was announced the previous January.

== Teams ==
=== Pittsburgh ===
After an 8–4 season in 1975, Pittsburgh was ranked ninth in the preseason AP Poll in 1976, with their opener at #11 Notre Dame; they won 31–10, and the Panthers rose to third in the next poll. When Michigan lost to Purdue on November 6, the Panthers climbed to first. Pittsburgh beat West Virginia in the Backyard Brawl and Penn State at Three Rivers Stadium to finish the regular season undefeated, and were invited to the Sugar Bowl for the chance to win the national championship. This was the first time the Panthers had made bowl appearances in consecutive seasons since 1955–1956 (last playing in the Sugar Bowl in January 1956).

Senior halfback Tony Dorsett rushed for 1,948 yards in the regular season, and became the first Panther to win the Heisman Trophy.

=== Georgia ===
Georgia had started 4–0, including a 21–0 shutout of Alabama, but a four-point loss at Ole Miss dropped them from #4 to #11. But the Bulldogs finished the season with six straight victories to get back to #4 along with being champion of the Southeastern Conference, their first SEC title since 1968. This was Georgia's fourth straight bowl appearance and first Sugar Bowl since January 1969. The Bulldogs had played just one game on artificial turf in the regular season, a loss at Ole Miss. This was the first year in which the SEC was the official conference tie-in to the Sugar Bowl.

== Game summary ==
The game kicked off shortly before 12 noon CST, more than an hour ahead of the Cotton Bowl.

Pittsburgh took control early, driving 80 yards in 12 plays that culminated with a touchdown run by quarterback Matt Cavanaugh. Seven minutes into the second quarter, he completed a pass to Gordon Jones for 59 yards for a touchdown to make it 14–0. Near the end of the quarter, Tony Dorsett scored from eleven yards out and it was 21–0 at halftime. Georgia's 6–2 defense had focused on Dorsett, which opened up the Panthers' passing game. Pittsburgh took advantage, passing for 185 yards in the first half while Dorsett was held to 65 yards; he rushed for 137 yards in the second half.

A Pittsburgh fumble on the first drive of the second half gave the ball to Georgia at the Panther 26, but the Bulldogs could only get it down to the 7 yard line; Allan Leavitt kicked a 25-yard field goal for Georgia's only points of the game. Panther kicker Carson Long countered with a 42-yarder to make it 24–3 after three quarters. In the fourth quarter, he kicked another from 31 yards to make the final score 27–3. Dorsett rushed for 202 yards on 32 carries (6.3 avg.), scoring one touchdown. Running back (and future Georgia head coach) Ray Goff rushed for 76 yards on 17 carries. Cavanaugh was 10-of-18 for 192 yards for one touchdown and was named game MVP. Georgia's option quarterback Ray Goff was replaced by Matt Robinson, who completed just two of fifteen attempts for 33 yards with three interceptions.

With the win, Pittsburgh was declared national champions by both major polls, their first since 1937.

=== Scoring ===
First quarter

- Pittsburgh – Matt Cavanaugh, 6-yard run (Carson Long kick)

Second quarter

- Pittsburgh – Gordon Jones, 59-yard pass from Cavanaugh (Long kick)
- Pittsburgh – Tony Dorsett, 11-yard run (Long kick)

Third quarter

- Georgia – Allan Leavitt, 25-yard field goal
- Pittsburgh – Long, 42-yard field goal

Fourth quarter

- Pittsburgh – Long, 31-yard field goal

== Statistics ==
Statistics	Pittsburgh	Georgia
First downs	24	14
Rushing yards	66–288	40–135
Passing yards	192	46
Passing	10–18–0	3–22–4
Total offense	84–480	62–181
Punts–average	5–36.8	8–42.1
Fumbles–lost	2–1	4–2
Turnovers	1	6
Penalties–yards	6–66	4–30

== Aftermath ==
Announced weeks earlier, Majors left Pittsburgh for his alma mater Tennessee after the game, and this remains Pittsburgh's most recent national championship. The Panthers returned once to the Sugar Bowl, while Georgia has returned six times; the two teams met in the Sugar Bowl five years later in January 1982.

During the 1970s, the top-ranked team won its bowl game only three times: Pittsburgh joined Nebraska (1971) and USC (1972).
