= 1976 Vanderbilt Commodores football team =

American college football season

1976 Vanderbilt Commodores football
- Conference: Southeastern Conference
- Record: 2–9 (0–6 SEC)
- Head coach: Fred Pancoast (2nd season)
- Offensive coordinator: Richard Trail (2nd season)
- Defensive coordinator: Frank Emanuel (2nd season)
- Home stadium: Dudley Field

1976 Southeastern Conference football standings
	Conf.					Overall
Team	W		L		T	W		L		T
No. 10 Georgia $	5	–	1	–	0	10	–	2	–	0
No. 11 Alabama	5	–	2	–	0	9	–	3	–	0
No. 20 Mississippi State	4	–	2	–	0	9	–	2	–	0
Florida	4	–	2	–	0	8	–	4	–	0
No. 18 Kentucky $	4	–	2	–	0	8	–	4	–	0
LSU	3	–	3	–	0	6	–	4	–	1
Auburn	3	–	3	–	0	4	–	7	–	0
Ole Miss	3	–	4	–	0	5	–	6	–	0
Tennessee	2	–	4	–	0	6	–	5	–	0
Vanderbilt	0	–	6	–	0	2	–	9	–	0
$ – Conference champion; Mississippi State later forfeited all 1976 wins due to NCAA violations. Kentucky retroactively announced in 1978 as SEC co-champion.; Rankings from AP Poll

The 1976 Vanderbilt Commodores football team represented Vanderbilt University in the 1976 NCAA Division I football season. The Commodores were led by head coach Fred Pancoast in his second season and finished the season with a record of two wins and nine losses (2–9 overall, 0–6 in the SEC).

== Schedule ==
Date	Opponent	Site	Result	Attendance	Source
September 11	No. 5 Oklahoma*	Dudley Field; Nashville, TN	L 3–24	34,694	
September 18	Wake Forest*	Dudley Field; Nashville, TN	W 27–24	21,900	
September 25	at No. 13 Alabama	Bryant–Denny Stadium; Tuscaloosa, AL	L 14–42	58,414	
October 2	Tulane*	Dudley Field; Nashville, TN	L 13–24	21,000	
October 9	at No. 20 LSU	Tiger Stadium; Baton Rouge, LA	L 20–33	66,835	
October 16	at No. 11 Georgia	Sanford Stadium; Athens, GA (rivalry)	L 0–45	59,100	
October 23	Ole Miss	Dudley Field; Nashville, TN (rivalry)	L 3–20	23,000	
November 6	at Kentucky	Commonwealth Stadium; Lexington, KY (rivalry)	L 0–14	57,269	
November 13	Air Force*	Dudley Field; Nashville, TN	W 34–10	21,900	
November 20	at Cincinnati*	Nippert Stadium; Cincinnati, OH	L 7–33	11,265	
November 27	Tennessee	Dudley Field; Nashville, TN (rivalry)	L 10–13	34,694	
*Non-conference game; Rankings from AP Poll released prior to the game

== Team players drafted into the NFL ==
Player	Position	Round	Pick	NFL club
Steve Curnutte	Defensive end	16	471	New York Giants
