= 1976 Tennessee Volunteers football team =

American college football season

1976 Tennessee Volunteers football
- Conference: Southeastern Conference
- Record: 6–5 (2–4 SEC)
- Head coach: Bill Battle (7th season)
- Offensive coordinator: Dal Shealy
- Defensive coordinator: Larry Jones
- Captains: Larry Seivers; Andy Spiva
- Home stadium: Neyland Stadium

1976 Southeastern Conference football standings
	Conf.					Overall
Team	W		L		T	W		L		T
No. 10 Georgia $	5	–	1	–	0	10	–	2	–	0
No. 11 Alabama	5	–	2	–	0	9	–	3	–	0
No. 20 Mississippi State	4	–	2	–	0	9	–	2	–	0
Florida	4	–	2	–	0	8	–	4	–	0
No. 18 Kentucky $	4	–	2	–	0	8	–	4	–	0
LSU	3	–	3	–	0	6	–	4	–	1
Auburn	3	–	3	–	0	4	–	7	–	0
Ole Miss	3	–	4	–	0	5	–	6	–	0
Tennessee	2	–	4	–	0	6	–	5	–	0
Vanderbilt	0	–	6	–	0	2	–	9	–	0
$ – Conference champion; Mississippi State later forfeited all 1976 wins due to NCAA violations. Kentucky retroactively announced in 1978 as SEC co-champion.; Rankings from AP Poll

The 1976 Tennessee Volunteers football team (variously "Tennessee", "UT" or the "Vols") represented the University of Tennessee in the 1976 NCAA Division I football season. Playing as a member of the Southeastern Conference (SEC), the team was led by head coach Bill Battle, in his seventh year, and played their home games at Neyland Stadium in Knoxville, Tennessee. They finished the season with a record of six wins and five losses (6–5 overall, 2–4 in the SEC). The Volunteers offense scored 237 points while the defense allowed 162 points.

== Schedule ==
Date	Opponent	Site	TV	Result	Attendance	Source
September 11	Duke*	Neyland Stadium; Knoxville, TN		L 18–21	82,687	
September 18	TCU*	Neyland Stadium; Knoxville, TN		W 31–0	79,564	
September 25	at Auburn	Legion Field; Birmingham, AL	ABC	L 28–38	50,000	
October 2	Clemson*	Neyland Stadium; Knoxville, TN		W 21–19	78,161	
October 9	at Georgia Tech*	Grant Field; Atlanta, GA		W 42–7	55,631	
October 16	No. 20 Alabama	Neyland Stadium; Knoxville, TN (Third Saturday in October)	ABC	L 13–20	82,417	
October 23	No. 11 Florida	Neyland Stadium; Knoxville, TN (rivalry)		L 18–20	82,596	
November 6	at Memphis State*	Liberty Bowl Memorial Stadium; Memphis, TN		W 21–14	52,311	
November 13	Ole Miss^{†}	Neyland Stadium; Knoxville, TN (rivalry)		W 32–6	79,161	
November 20	Kentucky	Neyland Stadium; Knoxville, TN (rivalry)		L 0–7	80,336	
November 27	at Vanderbilt	Dudley Field; Nashville, TN		W 13–10	34,694	
*Non-conference game; ^{†}Homecoming; Rankings from AP Poll released prior to the game

== Roster ==
- PK Jimmy Gaylor
- QB Joe Hough
- Roland James (defense)
- RB Stanley Morgan
- QB Randy Wallace

== Team players drafted into the NFL ==
Player	Position	Round	Pick	NFL club
Stanley Morgan	Wide receiver	1	25	New England Patriots
Larry Seivers	Wide receiver	4	111	Seattle Seahawks
Mickey Marvin	Guard	4	112	Oakland Raiders
Andy Spiva	Linebacker	5	135	St. Louis Cardinals
