= 1977 Sun Bowl =

The 1977 Sun Bowl may refer to:

- 1977 Sun Bowl (January) - January 2, 1977, game between the Texas A&M Aggies and the Florida Gators
- 1977 Sun Bowl (December) - December 31, 1977, game between the Stanford Cardinals and the LSU Tigers
