= Ken Cooper (American football coach) =

American football player and coach (1936–2017)

Biographical details
- Born: October 12, 1936; Enigma, Georgia, U.S.
- Died: May 30, 2017 (aged 80); Skidaway Island, Georgia, U.S.
- Education: Georgia

Playing career
- 1955–1957: Georgia
- Position: End

Coaching career (HC unless noted)
- 1963–1970: Georgia (assistant)
- 1971–1973: Ole Miss (assistant)
- 1974–1977: Ole Miss

Head coaching record
- Overall: 20-24

Accomplishments and honors

Awards
- SEC Coach of the Year (1975)

Elmer C. "Ken" Cooper Jr. (October 12, 1936 – May 30, 2017) was an American football player and coach. He served as the head football coach at the University of Mississippi from 1974 to 1977, compiling a record of 20-24. Cooper was named the SEC Coach of the Year in 1975.

Cooper died on May 30, 2017, at his home in Skidaway Island, Georgia.

== Head coaching record ==
| Year | Team | Overall | Conference | Standing | Bowl/playoffs |
|---|---|---|---|---|---|
Ole Miss Rebels (Southeastern Conference) (1974–1977)
| 1974 | Ole Miss | 3–8 | 0–6 | 10th | |
| 1975 | Ole Miss | 6–5 | 5–1 | T–2nd | |
| 1976 | Ole Miss | 5-6 | 3-4 | 6th | |
| 1977 | Ole Miss | 6-5 | 3-4 | 6th | |
| Ole Miss: | | 20-24 | 11-15 | | |
| Total: | | 20-24 | | | |
