= 1976 Auburn Tigers football team =

American college football season

1976 Auburn Tigers football
- Conference: Southeastern Conference
- Record: 4–7 (3–3 SEC)
- Head coach: Doug Barfield (1st season)
- Offensive coordinator: Larry Beightol (1st season)
- Defensive coordinator: P. W. Underwood (1st season)
- Home stadium: Jordan-Hare Stadium; Legion Field

1976 Southeastern Conference football standings
	Conf.					Overall
Team	W		L		T	W		L		T
No. 10 Georgia $	5	–	1	–	0	10	–	2	–	0
No. 11 Alabama	5	–	2	–	0	9	–	3	–	0
No. 20 Mississippi State	4	–	2	–	0	9	–	2	–	0
Florida	4	–	2	–	0	8	–	4	–	0
No. 18 Kentucky $	4	–	2	–	0	8	–	4	–	0
LSU	3	–	3	–	0	6	–	4	–	1
Auburn	3	–	3	–	0	4	–	7	–	0
Ole Miss	3	–	4	–	0	5	–	6	–	0
Tennessee	2	–	4	–	0	6	–	5	–	0
Vanderbilt	0	–	6	–	0	2	–	9	–	0
$ – Conference champion; Mississippi State later forfeited all 1976 wins due to NCAA violations. Kentucky retroactively announced in 1978 as SEC co-champion.; Rankings from AP Poll

The 1976 Auburn Tigers football team represented Auburn University in the 1976 NCAA Division I football season. At the end of the 1975 season, Ralph "Shug" Jordan retired after 25 years as head coach of the Auburn Tigers. Doug Barfield, Jordan's offensive coordinator, took over as head coach starting in 1976. He coached the Tigers to a 3–8 record his first season, winning just 2 of 6 conference games. However, Mississippi State was forced to forfeit their game that year, so Auburn's record officially improved to 4–7 (3–3).

Neil O'Donoghue (PK) received All-American honors and for the 1976 season, yet there were no players named to the All-SEC first team this year.

== Schedule ==
Date	Opponent	Site	Result	Attendance	Source
September 11	at Arizona*	Arizona Stadium; Tucson, AZ	L 19–31	52,206	
September 18	Baylor*	Jordan-Hare Stadium; Auburn, AL	L 14–15	50,000	
September 25	Tennessee	Legion Field; Birmingham, AL (rivalry)	W 38–28	50,000	
October 2	at No. 16 Ole Miss	Mississippi Veterans Memorial Stadium; Jackson, MS (rivalry)	W 10–0	40,500	
October 9	at Memphis State*	Liberty Bowl Memorial Stadium; Memphis, TN	L 27–28	48,561	
October 16	Georgia Tech*	Jordan-Hare Stadium; Auburn, AL (rivalry)	L 10–28	63,786	
October 23	Florida State*^{†}	Jordan-Hare Stadium; Auburn, AL	W 31–19	58,500	
October 30	at No. 12 Florida	Florida Field; Gainesville, FL (rivalry)	L 19–24	65,129	
November 6	at Mississippi State	Mississippi Veterans Memorial Stadium; Jackson, MS	W 19–28 (forfeit win)	37,000	
November 13	No. 7 Georgia	Jordan-Hare Stadium; Auburn, AL (rivalry)	L 0–28	63,912	
November 27	vs. No. 18 Alabama	Legion Field; Birmingham, AL (Iron Bowl)	L 7–38	70,303	
*Non-conference game; ^{†}Homecoming; Rankings from AP Poll released prior to the game
