= 1976 LSU Tigers football team =

American college football season

1976 LSU Tigers football
- Conference: Southeastern Conference
- Record: 7–3–1 (3–3 SEC)
- Head coach: Charles McClendon (15th season)
- Captains: Butch Knight; Roy Stuart
- Home stadium: Tiger Stadium

1976 Southeastern Conference football standings
| | Conf. | | | | | Overall |
| Team | W | | L | | T | W | | L | | T |
|---|---|---|---|---|---|---|---|---|---|---|
| No. 10 Georgia $ | 5 | – | 1 | – | 0 | 10 | – | 2 | – | 0 |
| No. 11 Alabama | 5 | – | 2 | – | 0 | 9 | – | 3 | – | 0 |
| No. 20 Mississippi State | 4 | – | 2 | – | 0 | 9 | – | 2 | – | 0 |
| Florida | 4 | – | 2 | – | 0 | 8 | – | 4 | – | 0 |
| No. 18 Kentucky $ | 4 | – | 2 | – | 0 | 8 | – | 4 | – | 0 |
| LSU | 3 | – | 3 | – | 0 | 6 | – | 4 | – | 1 |
| Auburn | 3 | – | 3 | – | 0 | 4 | – | 7 | – | 0 |
| Ole Miss | 3 | – | 4 | – | 0 | 5 | – | 6 | – | 0 |
| Tennessee | 2 | – | 4 | – | 0 | 6 | – | 5 | – | 0 |
| Vanderbilt | 0 | – | 6 | – | 0 | 2 | – | 9 | – | 0 |
$ – Conference champion; Mississippi State later forfeited all 1976 wins due to NCAA violations. Kentucky retroactively announced in 1978 as SEC co-champion.; Rankings from AP Poll

The 1976 LSU Tigers football team represented Louisiana State University (LSU) as a member of the Southeastern Conference (SEC) during the 1976 NCAA Division I football season. Led by 15th-year head coach Charles McClendon, the Tigers compiled an overall record of 7–3–1, with a mark of 3–3 in conference play, and finished tied for sixth in the SEC.

== Schedule ==
| Date | Opponent | Rank | Site | Result | Attendance | Source |
|---|---|---|---|---|---|---|
| September 11 | No. 1 Nebraska* | | Tiger Stadium; Baton Rouge, LA | T 6–6 | 70,746 | |
| September 18 | Oregon State* | No. 16 | Tiger Stadium; Baton Rouge, LA | W 28–11 | 68,057 | |
| September 25 | Rice* | No. 15 | Tiger Stadium; Baton Rouge, LA | W 31–0 | 67,260 | |
| October 2 | at No. 19 Florida | No. 11 | Florida Field; Gainesville, FL (rivalry) | L 23–28 | 57,119 | |
| October 9 | Vanderbilt^{†} | No. 20 | Tiger Stadium; Baton Rouge, LA | W 33–20 | 66,835 | |
| October 16 | at Kentucky | No. 16 | Commonwealth Stadium; Lexington, KY | L 7–21 | 57,695 | |
| October 30 | Ole Miss | | Tiger Stadium; Baton Rouge, LA (rivalry) | W 45–0 | 67,350 | |
| November 6 | at No. 15 Alabama | | Legion Field; Birmingham, AL (rivalry) | L 17–28 | 71,018 | |
| November 13 | at Mississippi State | | Mississippi Veterans Memorial Stadium; Jackson, MS (rivalry) | W 13–21 (forfeit) | 40,000 | |
| November 20 | Tulane* | | Tiger Stadium; Baton Rouge, LA (Battle for the Rag) | W 17–7 | 64,318 | |
| November 27 | Utah* | | Tiger Stadium; Baton Rouge, LA | W 35–7 | 48,455 | |
*Non-conference game; ^{†}Homecoming; Rankings from AP Poll released prior to the game

== Roster ==
1976 LSU Tigers football team roster
Players
Coaches
Offense

| Pos. | # | Name | Class |
|---|---|---|---|
| RB | 4 | Charles Alexander | So |
| QB | | Steve Ensminger | Fr |

Defense

| Pos. | # | Name | Class |
|---|---|---|---|
| DB | 37 | Willie Teal | Fr |

Special teams

| Pos. | # | Name | Class |

Head coach

- Charles McClendon

Coordinators/assistant coaches

Legend

- (C) Team captain
- (S) Suspended
- (I) Ineligible
- Injured
- Redshirt
