= 1977 Sun Bowl (January) =

American college football game

Florida Gators	Texas A&M Aggies
(8–3)	(9–2)
SEC	SWC
14	37
Head coach: Doug Dickey	Head coach: Emory Bellard
AP / Coaches; NR / 20	AP / Coaches; 10 / 10
	1	2	3	4	Total
Florida	0	0	7	7	14
Texas A&M	3	13	8	13	37
- Date: January 2, 1977
- Season: 1976
- Stadium: Sun Bowl
- Location: El Paso, Texas
- MVP: K Tony Franklin
- National anthem: Cyndi Grecco
- Halftime show: Fightin' Texas Aggie Band & Cyndi Grecco
- Attendance: 33,250

United States TV coverage
- Network: CBS
- Announcers: Pat Summerall; Tom Brookshier

The January 1977 Sun Bowl was a college football postseason bowl game that featured the Texas A&M Aggies and the Florida Gators.

== Background ==
The Aggies finished third in the Southwest Conference due to losses to the eventual co-champions of the conference, Texas Tech and Houston, though they were invited to their first ever Sun Bowl. The Gators finished tied for third in the Southeastern Conference with Kentucky and Mississippi State in their fourth straight bowl season.

The game was moved from its traditional late December date to Sunday, January 2, which was the open week between the National Football League's conference championship games and Super Bowl XI.

== Game summary ==
The Aggies scored first on a Tony Franklin field goal from 39 yards out after a drive of nearly 4 minutes to give them the lead midway through the first quarter. The Gators had a miserable first half, with two first downs and no completed passes in total. Aggies QB David Walker scored on a touchdown plunge to make it 10–0 in the 2nd quarter after a Florida fumble gave the ball to the Aggies at the 14. After a Florida punt, the Aggies were given the ball back at the 50. After gaining only 5 yards, the Aggies let Franklin attempt a 62-yard field goal, which went through the uprights. His kick set a postseason record and gave them a 13–0 lead. After both teams punted, the Aggies drove from their 33 to the Gator 16 and Franklin made a 33-yard field goal to make it 16–0 with 1:26 left in the second half. George Woodard scored on a touchdown plunge with 10:50 left in the third quarter on a short 45-yard drive. A successful 2-point conversion made the score 24–0 A&M. Wes Chandler rushed for a 29-yard touchdown to narrow the lead to 24–7. However, a Florida interception gave the ball back to the Aggies later in the quarter and George Woodard scored on a 3-yard touchdown plunge to make it 31–7. The Gators scored one last time in the fourth quarter on a Terry LeCount touchdown plunge to make it 31–14. Woodard scored on a touchdown pass from Walker with 3:08 left to make it 37–14, and the Aggies won soon after. Franklin kicked three field goals and kicked two extra point attempts in an MVP effort. He was later named to the 75th Anniversary All-Sun Bowl Team. George Woodard rushed for 125 yards on 25 attempts with 3 touchdowns.

== Aftermath ==
After the 1977 football season, A&M played in the Astro-Bluebonnet Bowl in December. Florida did not return to a bowl game until the 1980 Tangerine Bowl. A&M next played in the Sun Bowl in 1989, when it was known as the John Hancock Bowl. Through the 2019 football season, the January 1977 edition has been Florida's only Sun Bowl appearance, and has also been the most recent Sun Bowl not played in December.

== Statistics ==
Statistics	Texas A&M	Florida
First downs	20	14
Yards rushing	248	172
Yards passing	122	58
Total yards	370	230
Punts-Average	5-34.6	9-39.0
Fumbles-Lost	3-3	6–4
Interceptions Thrown	0	1
Penalties-Yards	6-33	4-26
