= Matt Robinson (American football) =

American football player (born 1955)

No. 17
- Position: Quarterback

Personal information
- Born: June 28, 1955 (age 71); Farmington, Michigan, U.S.
- Listed height: 6 ft 2 in (1.88 m)
- Listed weight: 196 lb (89 kg)

Career information
- High school: North Springs (Sandy Springs, Georgia)
- College: Georgia
- NFL draft: 1977: 9th round, 227th overall pick

Career history
- New York Jets (1977–1979); Denver Broncos (1980); Buffalo Bills (1981–1982); Jacksonville Bulls (1984); Portland Breakers (1985)

Awards and highlights
- Florida–Georgia Hall of Fame

Career NFL statistics
- Passing attempts: 523
- Passing completions: 244
- Completion percentage: 46.7%
- TD–INT: 18–38
- Passing yards: 3,519
- Passer rating: 50.2
- Stats at Pro Football Reference

Matthew Gillette Robinson (born June 28, 1955) is an American former professional football player, a quarterback in the National Football League (NFL) from 1977 to 1982 for the New York Jets, Denver Broncos, and Buffalo Bills. He was later with the Jacksonville Bulls and Portland Breakers of the United States Football League (USFL) in 1984 and 1985, respectively.

== College career ==
Robinson played college football at the University of Georgia under head coach Vince Dooley. His sophomore season in 1974 was his first as a starter and he led the Bulldogs to a 6–6 record. He threw for 8 touchdown passes and 10 interceptions. Georgia improved the next season though Robinson's stats went down; they finished at 9–3 and were ranked 19th in the AP poll. In 1976, Robinson's senior year, the Bulldogs went 10–1 in the regular season and were ranked fifth, but lost the Sugar Bowl to national champion Pittsburgh. When his college career concluded, Robinson finished with more interceptions (20) than touchdown passes (17).

== Professional career ==
Despite Georgia being a run-oriented team, Robinson was selected by the New York Jets in the ninth round of the 1977 NFL draft. With Richard Todd viewed as the quarterback of the future, Robinson was considered a "camp arm," a quarterback drafted only to get repetitions in practice so the incumbent starter doesn't get overworked in the preseason. Robinson defied the odds and made the team, and even got a start his rookie season, against the Seattle Seahawks in week nine, but the Jets were shut out 17–0.

Four games into the 1978 season, the Jets at 2–2, Todd was injured, and Robinson was pressed into service as the starter. The Jets lost his first start, but then won their next three and looked like a contender in the AFC East. Robinson made some big plays along the way, including a 75-yard strike to Wesley Walker to upset the defending AFC champion Denver Broncos 31–28 in week ten. Robinson's steady play along with an improved defense helped the Jets finish 8–8, a marked improvement over 1977's 3-11. For the year, Robinson passed for 2,002 yards and 13 TD's with 16 INT's. For the 1979 season, Robinson won the starting job in the pre-season, but jammed his thumb before the season began. Todd was re-instated as the starter and Robinson stayed as backup for one more year before being traded to the Broncos in exchange for a second and first round pick and back-up quarterback Craig Penrose.

In 1980, Robinson started the first seven games for the Broncos over veteran Craig Morton. During that time, the Broncos went 4–3. Robinson only spent one season in Denver, moving on to Buffalo to serve as the understudy to Joe Ferguson. Robinson then joined the Jacksonville Bulls of the USFL. His time in Jacksonville ended when the Bulls acquired Brian Sipe. Robinson then moved on to the Portland Breakers and finished his career there. In 1985, his final season as a pro, he split time with Doug Woodward, a quarterback out of tiny Pace College, as the Breakers were struggling to find a new quarterback after starter Johnnie Walton retired. The Breakers failed to generate much of an offense and finished 6–12 and missed the postseason.

In his final season, Robinson completed 156 passes on 310 attempts and threw 15 touchdowns and 20 interceptions for 2,182 yards.

== Post NFL career ==
Robinson remains active with the NFLPA, helping players who have recently retired making the transition from being a professional athlete to the next chapter of their lives.
