= Doug Barfield =

American football player and coach (born 1936)

Biographical details
- Born: March 14, 1936 (age 90); Grove Hill, Alabama, U.S.

Playing career

Football
- 1954–1956: Southern Miss

Baseball
- 1954–1957: Southern Miss
- Position: Quarterback (football)

Coaching career (HC unless noted)

Football
- 1962–1964: UMS-Wright (AL)
- 1965–1966: Andalusia HS (AL)
- 1967–1969: Southern Miss (OB)
- 1970–1971: Clemson (OB)
- 1972–1973: Auburn (assistant)
- 1974–1975: Auburn (OC)
- 1976–1980: Auburn
- 1981: Mississippi State (RB/WR)
- 1989: Hillcrest Evergreen HS (AL)
- 1990–1994: Opelika HS (AL)

Head coaching record
- Overall: 29–25–1 (college); 88–29–1 (high school)

Doug Barfield (born March 14, 1936) is an American former football player and coach. Barfield was the head football coach at Auburn University from 1976 to 1980 where he compiled an on-field record of 27–27–1 during his five-year tenure. Auburn was subsequently awarded two victories due to forfeits by Mississippi State in 1976 and 1977, thus improving Barfield's record to 29–25–1. Barfield lost all five games as head coach at Auburn against in-state rival, Alabama.

A native of Grove Hill, Alabama, Barfield played college football at The University of Southern Mississippi. Prior to becoming the head football coach at Auburn, he served as an assistant for several college football teams, including a stint as the offensive coordinator at Auburn from 1974 to 1975. After his dismissal as head coach at Auburn following the 1980 season, Barfield served as the head coach at several high schools in Alabama.

== Head coaching record ==
=== College ===
Year	Team	Overall	Conference	Standing	Bowl/playoffs	Coaches^{#}	AP^{°}
Auburn Tigers (Southeastern Conference) (1976–1980)
1976	Auburn	4–7	3–3	T–6th			
1977	Auburn	6–5	5–1	3rd			
1978	Auburn	6–4–1	3–2–1	3rd			
1979	Auburn	8–3	4–2	T–3rd			16
1980	Auburn	5–6	0–6	T–9th			
Auburn:		29–25–1	15–14–1				
Total:		29–25–1					
^{#}Rankings from final Coaches Poll.; ^{°}Rankings from final AP Poll.
