= 1976 Mississippi State Bulldogs football team =

American college football season

1976 Mississippi State Bulldogs football
- Conference: Southeastern Conference

Ranking
- AP: No. 20
- Record: 0–11, 9 wins forfeited (0–6 SEC, 4 wins forfeited)
- Head coach: Bob Tyler (4th season)
- Home stadium: Scott Field; Mississippi Veterans Memorial Stadium

1976 Southeastern Conference football standings
	Conf.					Overall
Team	W		L		T	W		L		T
No. 10 Georgia $	5	–	1	–	0	10	–	2	–	0
No. 11 Alabama	5	–	2	–	0	9	–	3	–	0
No. 20 Mississippi State	4	–	2	–	0	9	–	2	–	0
Florida	4	–	2	–	0	8	–	4	–	0
No. 18 Kentucky $	4	–	2	–	0	8	–	4	–	0
LSU	3	–	3	–	0	6	–	4	–	1
Auburn	3	–	3	–	0	4	–	7	–	0
Ole Miss	3	–	4	–	0	5	–	6	–	0
Tennessee	2	–	4	–	0	6	–	5	–	0
Vanderbilt	0	–	6	–	0	2	–	9	–	0
$ – Conference champion; Mississippi State later forfeited all 1976 wins due to NCAA violations. Kentucky retroactively announced in 1978 as SEC co-champion.; Rankings from AP Poll

The 1976 Mississippi State Bulldogs football team represented Mississippi State University during the 1976 NCAA Division I football season. The team was led by head coach Bob Tyler, competed as a member of the Southeastern Conference and finished the season with an overall record of nine wins and two losses (9–2, 4–2 SEC). However, in May 1978, the NCAA ruled Mississippi State to forfeit all nine victories due to having played an ineligible player.

== Schedule ==
Date	Opponent	Rank	Site	Result	Attendance	Source
September 4	North Texas State*		Scott Field; Starkville, MS	F 7–0 (forfeit)	29,000	
September 18	Louisville*		Scott Field; Starkville, MS	F 30–21 (forfeit)	27,000	
September 25	at Florida		Florida Field; Gainesville, FL	L 30–34	49,117	
October 2	Cal Poly Pomona*^{†}		Scott Field; Starkville, MS	F 38–0 (forfeit)	33,000	
October 9	Kentucky		Mississippi Veterans Memorial Stadium; Jackson, MS	F 14–7 (forfeit)	31,500	
October 16	at Memphis State*		Liberty Bowl Memorial Stadium; Memphis, TN	F 42–33 (forfeit)	51,704	
October 23	at Southern Miss*	No. 20	M. M. Roberts Stadium; Hattiesburg, MS	F 14–6 (forfeit)	31,225	
October 30	at No. 18 Alabama	No. 17	Bryant–Denny Stadium; Tuscaloosa, AL (rivalry)	L 17–34	53,617	
November 6	Auburn		Mississippi Veterans Memorial Stadium; Jackson, MS	F 28–19 (forfeit)	37,000	
November 13	LSU		Mississippi Veterans Memorial Stadium; Jackson, MS (rivalry)	F 21–13 (forfeit)	40,000	
November 20	Ole Miss		Mississippi Veterans Memorial Stadium; Jackson, MS (Egg Bowl)	F 28–11 (forfeit)	46,000	
*Non-conference game; ^{†}Homecoming; Rankings from AP Poll released prior to the game

== Personnel ==
1976 Mississippi State Bulldogs football team roster
Players
Coaches
Offense

Pos.	#	Name	Class
QB		Norman Joseph	Sr
QB		Bruce Threadgill	Jr

Defense

Pos.	#	Name	Class

Special teams

Pos.	#	Name	Class

Head coach

- Bob Tyler

Coordinators/assistant coaches

Legend

- (C) Team captain
- (S) Suspended
- (I) Ineligible
- Injured
- Redshirt
