= 1976 Peach Bowl =

American college football game

- 9th Peach Bowl
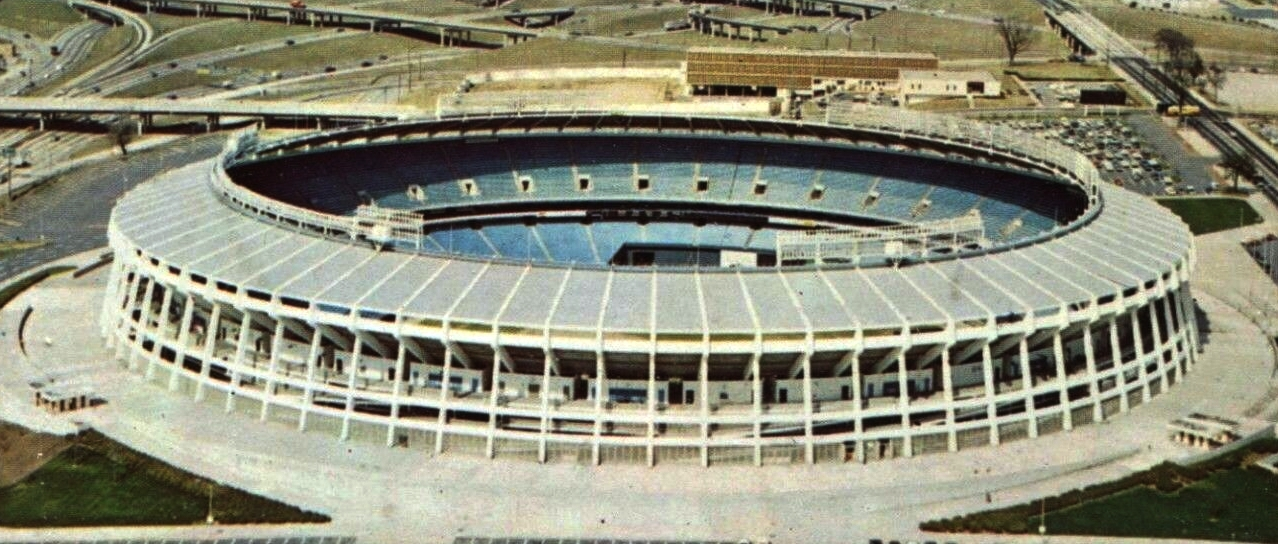
- Atlanta–Fulton County Stadium in Atlanta, Georgia, hosted the Peach Bowl.
Kentucky Wildcats	North Carolina Tar Heels
(7–4)	(9–2)
SEC	ACC
21	0
Head coach: Fran Curci	Head coach: Bill Dooley
	AP / Coaches; 19 / NR
	1	2	3	4	Total
Kentucky	0	0	7	14	21
North Carolina	0	0	0	0	0
- Date: December 31, 1976
- Season: 1976
- Stadium: Fulton County Stadium
- Location: Atlanta, Georgia
- MVP: Offense: RB Rod Stewart (Kentucky); Defense: LB Mike Martin (Kentucky)
- Favorite: Kentucky favored by 6
- Attendance: 54,132

United States TV coverage
- Network: Mizlou Television Network

The 1976 Peach Bowl was a postseason college football match between the Kentucky Wildcats and the North Carolina Tar Heels at Atlanta–Fulton County Stadium in Atlanta, Georgia on December 30, 1976. This game started at 2:30pm ET with at the time a sellout crowd at the Atlanta stadium with a total of 54,132 people in the stands. The University of Kentucky represented the Southeastern Conference (SEC) and North Carolina represented the Atlantic Coast Conference (ACC) in the competition. This was Kentucky's first post season bowl game in 25 years since playing TCU in the 1952 Cotton Bowl making Kentucky very motivated for a win against North Carolina. The game was the final competition of the 1976 football season for each team and resulted in a 21–0 Kentucky victory led by Kentucky running back Rod Stewart. North Carolina was the under dogs heading into the game with the Vegas line favoring Kentucky by 6 points.

== Background ==
Kentucky's losses consisted of Kansas, Mississippi State, Georgia, and Maryland while North Carolina's consisted of NC State and Missouri. Although Kentucky stood with a worse record, it was believed North Carolina was one of the worst 9-2 teams due to their weak strength of schedule. North Carolina entered the game with a 9–2 record and a ranking of #18 in the Associated Press poll after having been ranked as high as #14 during the season; Kentucky entered with a record of 7–4 and unranked.

== Game summary ==
Neither team scored during the first half. Two Kentucky drives ended deep in North Carolina territory with no score.

The second half consisted of numerous turnovers from North Carolina starting in the third quarter with UNC quarterback Matt Kupec fumbling at their own 21; Kentucky's James Ramey recovered. Seven plays later Kentucky running back Rod Stewart took it in for his first out of three touchdowns from a yard out. John Pierce's PAT gave Kentucky a 7–0 lead.

Starting out the fourth quarter, Kentucky drove 57 yards in 9 plays and with Stewart scoring his second touchdown on an easy 13-yard TD run. Pierce's PAT put the Wildcats up 14–0 with much of the 4th quarter still left to play.

North Carolina was still unable to answer all throughout the 4th. The Wildcats' defense shut them out and forcing a total of 5 turnovers at the end the game. Kentucky's last scoring drive consisted a very short drive and ended in another Rod Stewart touchdown from 3 yards out on 4th down. After Pierce's third and final PAT, the score was Kentucky 21, North Carolina 0.

Kentucky's defense was not the part of the team that dominated. Kentucky's offense also out gained North Carolinas offense 334 total yards to North Carolina's 108 total yards.

Rod Stewart's 104 rushing yards on only 19 carries earned him the title as game MVP along with tying a Peach Bowl record for most touchdowns (3). Rod Stewart finished the season with a total of 711 rushing yards on 146 carries making it his best season out of his college career and would later get drafted to the NFL in 1979 to the Buffalo Bills. Kentucky linebacker Mike Martin was also named the game's defensive MVP.

== Postgame ==
After the game, North Carolina fell out of the AP Top 20 and Kentucky finished the season ranked #18. The following season Kentucky went 10–1 and finished #6 in the final AP poll; North Carolina finished the season 8–3–1 after a loss in the Liberty Bowl.

== Sources ==
- 2001 Kentucky Wildcats Football Media Guide, '1976 Peach Bowl', p. 166
