= 1976 Florida Gators football team =

American college football season

1976 Florida Gators football

Sun Bowl, L 14–37 vs. Texas A&M
- Conference: Southeastern Conference
- Record: 8–4 (4–2 SEC)
- Head coach: Doug Dickey (7th season)
- Offensive coordinator: Jimmy Dunn (7th season)
- Offensive scheme: Wishbone
- Defensive coordinator: Doug Knotts (7th season)
- Captains: Darrell Carpenter; Alvin Cowens; Jimmy Fisher
- Home stadium: Florida Field

1976 Southeastern Conference football standings
	Conf.					Overall
Team	W		L		T	W		L		T
No. 10 Georgia $	5	–	1	–	0	10	–	2	–	0
No. 11 Alabama	5	–	2	–	0	9	–	3	–	0
No. 20 Mississippi State	4	–	2	–	0	9	–	2	–	0
Florida	4	–	2	–	0	8	–	4	–	0
No. 18 Kentucky $	4	–	2	–	0	8	–	4	–	0
LSU	3	–	3	–	0	6	–	4	–	1
Auburn	3	–	3	–	0	4	–	7	–	0
Ole Miss	3	–	4	–	0	5	–	6	–	0
Tennessee	2	–	4	–	0	6	–	5	–	0
Vanderbilt	0	–	6	–	0	2	–	9	–	0
$ – Conference champion; Mississippi State later forfeited all 1976 wins due to NCAA violations. Kentucky retroactively announced in 1978 as SEC co-champion.; Rankings from AP Poll

The 1976 Florida Gators football team represented the University of Florida during the 1976 NCAA Division I football season. The season was the seventh for Doug Dickey as the head coach of the Florida Gators football team. Dickey's 1976 Florida Gators finished with an 8–4 overall record and a 4–2 record in the Southeastern Conference (SEC), placing fourth among ten SEC teams.

== Schedule ==
Date	Opponent	Rank	Site	TV	Result	Attendance	Source
September 11	vs. North Carolina*	No. 18	Tampa Stadium; Tampa, FL		L 21–24	42,262	
September 18	Houston*		Florida Field; Gainesville, FL		W 49–14	49,820	
September 25	Mississippi State		Florida Field; Gainesville, FL		W 34–30	49,117	
October 2	No. 11 LSU	No. 19	Florida Field; Gainesville, FL (rivalry)		W 28–23	57,119	
October 16	at Florida State*	No. 12	Doak Campbell Stadium; Tallahassee, FL (rivalry)		W 33–26	42,803	
October 23	at Tennessee	No. 11	Neyland Stadium; Knoxville, TN (rivalry)		W 20–18	82,596	
October 30	Auburn	No. 12	Florida Field; Gainesville, FL (rivalry)		W 24–19	65,129	
November 6	vs. No. 7 Georgia	No. 10	Gator Bowl Stadium; Jacksonville, FL (rivalry)	ABC	L 27–41	70,314	
November 13	at Kentucky	No. 15	Commonwealth Stadium; Lexington, KY (rivalry)		L 9–28	55,000	
November 20	Rice*^{†}		Florida Field; Gainesville, FL		W 50–22	53,275	
November 27	vs. Miami (FL)*		Citrus Bowl; Orlando, FL (rivalry)		W 19–10	40,055	
January 2, 1977	vs. No. 10 Texas A&M*		Sun Bowl; El Paso, TX (Sun Bowl)	CBS	L 14–37	33,250	
*Non-conference game; ^{†}Homecoming; Rankings from AP Poll released prior to the game

== Personnel ==
1976 Florida Gators football team roster
Players
Coaches
Offense

Pos.	#	Name	Class
RB		Larry Brinson
RB		Earl Carr
WR	89	Wes Chandler
RB		Ron Enciade
QB		Jimmy Fisher (C)
OL		David Forrester
WR		Derrick Gaffney
RB		Napoleon Green
RB		Tony Green
QB		Bill Kynes
RB		Sammy Lemon
OL		Robbie Moore
RB		Robert Morgan
OL		Bruce Mulliniks
QB		Mark Newman
RB	37	Joe Portale
OL		Joe Pupello
WR		Scott Shuler
TE		Jimmy Stephens
TE		Tony Stephens
OL		Keith Tribble
RB		Willie Wilder

Defense

Pos.	#	Name	Class
DB		Tim Aydt
DB		Steve Blair
LB		Scot Brantley
DL		Darrell Carpenter (C)
DL		Ron Coleman
DB		Alvin Cowans (C)
DB		Warren Gaffney
DB		Chuck Hatch
LB		Scot Hutchinson
DL		Jeff Kanter
DL		Sylvester King
DB		Terry LeCount
DB		Alvin Parrish
DL		Richard Ruth
LB		Charlie Williams

Special teams

Pos.	#	Name	Class
K		David Posey	Sr
P		Alan Williams

Head coach

- Doug Dickey

Coordinators/assistant coaches

- Jimmy Dunn
- Doug Knotts

Legend

- (C) Team captain
- (S) Suspended
- (I) Ineligible
- Injured
- Redshirt
