= 1976 Georgia Bulldogs football team =

American college football season

1976 Georgia Bulldogs football

SEC champion

Sugar Bowl, L 3–27 vs. Pittsburgh
- Conference: Southeastern Conference

Ranking
- Coaches: No. 10
- AP: No. 10
- Record: 10–2 (5–1 SEC)
- Head coach: Vince Dooley (13th season)
- Defensive coordinator: Erk Russell (13th season)
- Base defense: 4–4
- Captain: Ray Goff
- Home stadium: Sanford Stadium

1976 Southeastern Conference football standings
	Conf.					Overall
Team	W		L		T	W		L		T
No. 10 Georgia $	5	–	1	–	0	10	–	2	–	0
No. 11 Alabama	5	–	2	–	0	9	–	3	–	0
No. 20 Mississippi State	4	–	2	–	0	9	–	2	–	0
Florida	4	–	2	–	0	8	–	4	–	0
No. 18 Kentucky $	4	–	2	–	0	8	–	4	–	0
LSU	3	–	3	–	0	6	–	4	–	1
Auburn	3	–	3	–	0	4	–	7	–	0
Ole Miss	3	–	4	–	0	5	–	6	–	0
Tennessee	2	–	4	–	0	6	–	5	–	0
Vanderbilt	0	–	6	–	0	2	–	9	–	0
$ – Conference champion; Mississippi State later forfeited all 1976 wins due to NCAA violations. Kentucky retroactively announced in 1978 as SEC co-champion.; Rankings from AP Poll

The 1976 Georgia Bulldogs football team represented the University of Georgia as a member of the Southeastern Conference (SEC) during the 1976 NCAA Division I football season. Led by 13th-year head coach Vince Dooley, the Bulldogs compiled an overall record of 10–2, with a mark of 5–1 in conference play, and finished as SEC champion.

== Schedule ==
Date	Opponent	Rank	Site	TV	Result	Attendance	Source
September 11	No. 15 California*	No. 16	Sanford Stadium; Athens, GA		W 36–24	47,000	
September 18	at Clemson*	No. 9	Memorial Stadium; Clemson, SC (rivalry)	ABC	W 41–0	41,000	
September 25	South Carolina*	No. 7	Sanford Stadium; Athens, GA (rivalry)		W 20–12	59,935	
October 2	No. 10 Alabama	No. 6	Sanford Stadium; Athens, GA (rivalry)		W 21–0	60,200	
October 9	at Ole Miss	No. 4	Hemingway Stadium; Oxford, MS		L 17–21	36,471	
October 16	Vanderbilt^{†}	No. 11	Sanford Stadium; Athens, GA (rivalry)		W 45–0	59,100	
October 23	at Kentucky	No. 10	Commonwealth Stadium; Lexington, KY		W 31–7	57,733	
October 30	No. 20 Cincinnati*	No. 7	Sanford Stadium; Athens, GA		W 31–17	49,500	
November 6	vs. No. 10 Florida	No. 7	Gator Bowl Stadium; Jacksonville, FL (rivalry)	ABC	W 41–27	70,314	
November 13	at Auburn	No. 7	Jordan-Hare Stadium; Auburn, AL (rivalry)		W 28–0	63,912	
November 27	Georgia Tech*	No. 4	Sanford Stadium; Athens, GA (rivalry)		W 13–10	60,500	
January 1, 1977	vs. No. 1 Pittsburgh*	No. 5	Louisiana Superdome; New Orleans, LA (Sugar Bowl)	ABC	L 3–27	76,117	
*Non-conference game; ^{†}Homecoming; Rankings from AP Poll released prior to the game

== Roster ==
1976 Georgia Bulldogs football team roster
Players
Coaches
Offense

Pos.	#	Name	Class
OT	66	George Collins	Jr
WR	80	Steve Davis	Sr
QB	10	Ray Goff (C)	Sr
RB	36	Willie McClendon	So
RB	39	Kevin McLee	Jr
TE	85	Ulysses Norris	So
G	67	Joel Parrish	Sr
RB	43	Al Pollard	Sr
G	60	Kirk Price	Jr
QB	17	Matt Robinson	Sr
TE	89	Wally Tereshinski	Jr
WR	82	Gene Washington	Sr
WR	8	Mark Wilson	Sr
OT	77	Mike Wilson	Sr

Defense

Pos.	#	Name	Class
DE	87	Dicky Clark	Sr
DE	92	Lawrence Craft	Sr
CB	32	Johnny Henderson	Jr
DL	99	Jeff Sanders	Sr
DL	78	Ronnie Swoopes	Jr
LB	44	Ben Zambiasi	Jr

Special teams

Pos.	#	Name	Class
P	4	Bucky Dilts	Sr
K	9	Allan Leavitt	Sr

Head coach

- Vince Dooley

Coordinators/assistant coaches

- Erk Russell (DC)

Legend

- (C) Team captain
- (S) Suspended
- (I) Ineligible
- Injured
- Redshirt
