= Barry Krauss =

American football player (born 1957)

No. 55, 58
- Position: Linebacker

Personal information
- Born: March 17, 1957 (age 69); Pompano Beach, Florida, U.S.
- Listed height: 6 ft 3 in (1.91 m)
- Listed weight: 245 lb (111 kg)

Career information
- High school: Pompano Beach (FL)
- College: Alabama
- NFL draft: 1979: 1st round, 6th overall pick

Career history
- Baltimore/Indianapolis Colts (1979–1988); Miami Dolphins (1989–1990)

Awards and highlights
- National champion (1978); First-team All-American (1978); First-team All-SEC (1978); Second-team All-SEC (1977)

Career NFL statistics
- Sacks: 10
- Forced fumbles: 16
- Interceptions: 6
- Stats at Pro Football Reference

Richard Barry Krauss (born March 17, 1957) is an American former professional football player who was a linebacker for 12 seasons in the National Football League (NFL).

== Early life ==
Krauss was born and reared in Pompano Beach, Florida; he was a star football player at Pompano Beach High School from 1972 to 1975. Voted as Sun Sentinel's "All-Time Broward County Linebacker", Voted to the State of Florida's "Top 100 Football All-Star Team", Most Valuable Player of the MENAC Bowl: 1975. Voted as Sun Sentinel's Player of the Year: 1975.

== College career ==
Highly recruited out of high school, he played college football at the University of Alabama for the legendary coach Paul "Bear" Bryant and was a key member of Alabama's 1978 National Championship football team. At the 1979 Sugar Bowl in one of the most famous plays in college football history, Krauss stopped Penn State running back Mike Guman short of the goal line late in the 4th quarter to help the Crimson Tide to the National Championship. Krauss was selected MVP of the game for his efforts.

Alabama's All-Century Team: 1970's, Atlanta Touchdown Club's Southeastern Conference Lineman of the Year: 1976, All-American 1977–78, All-SEC 1977–78, Liberty Bowl Most Valuable Player and Defensive Player: 1976, Sugar Bowl Most Valuable Player: 1979 (only defensive player to win MVP in first 75 years of Sugar Bowl History), Defensive Player of the Week Honor: CBS Broadcast of NCAA/Chevrolet Scholarship Program – LSU vs Alabama: 1978, Birmingham Monday Morning QB Club's Defensive Player of the Year: 1978, Inducted into the Alabama Sports Hall of Fame: 2007.

== Professional career ==
Krauss was the first-round draft choice (6th overall pick) in 1979 for the Baltimore Colts. He played ten years in the NFL with the Colts and played his final two seasons with the Miami Dolphins. In 12 seasons, he played in 152 games, amassed over 1,000 tackles and had 8 sacks and 6 interceptions.

== After football ==
Today he is a professional broadcaster and motivational speaker based in Carmel, Indiana. In 2007, he was inducted into the Alabama Sports Hall of Fame.
