= Bruce Threadgill =

American gridiron football player (born 1956)

No. 23, 7
- Positions: Quarterback, Safety

Personal information
- Born: May 7, 1956 (age 70); Nocona, Texas, U.S.
- Listed height: 6 ft 0 in (1.83 m)
- Listed weight: 190 lb (86 kg)

Career information
- College: Mississippi State
- NFL draft: 1978: 5th round, 133rd overall pick

Career history
- 1978: San Francisco 49ers
- 1979–1982: Calgary Stampeders
- 1984–1985: Houston Gamblers
- Stats at Pro Football Reference

Bruce Craig Threadgill (born May 7, 1956) is an American former professional football quarterback for the National Football League (NFL), Canadian Football League (CFL), and the United States Football League (USFL). He played safety (and briefly in one game at quarterback) for the San Francisco 49ers in 1978 and was claimed off waivers by the New York Giants in 1979, but was released before the season began. He played quarterback for the Calgary Stampeders from 1979 to 1982 and the Houston Gamblers from 1984 to 1985.
