= 1976 Kentucky Wildcats football team =

American college football season

1976 Kentucky Wildcats football

Peach Bowl champion SEC co-champion (retroactively awarded in 1978)

Peach Bowl, W 21–0 vs. North Carolina
- Conference: Southeastern Conference

Ranking
- Coaches: No. 19
- AP: No. 18
- Record: 8–4 (4–2 SEC)
- Head coach: Fran Curci (4th season)
- Offensive coordinator: Jon Mirilovich (4th season)
- Defensive coordinator: Charlie Bailey (2nd season)
- Home stadium: Commonwealth Stadium

1976 Southeastern Conference football standings
	Conf.					Overall
Team	W		L		T	W		L		T
No. 10 Georgia $	5	–	1	–	0	10	–	2	–	0
No. 11 Alabama	5	–	2	–	0	9	–	3	–	0
No. 20 Mississippi State	4	–	2	–	0	9	–	2	–	0
Florida	4	–	2	–	0	8	–	4	–	0
No. 18 Kentucky $	4	–	2	–	0	8	–	4	–	0
LSU	3	–	3	–	0	6	–	4	–	1
Auburn	3	–	3	–	0	4	–	7	–	0
Ole Miss	3	–	4	–	0	5	–	6	–	0
Tennessee	2	–	4	–	0	6	–	5	–	0
Vanderbilt	0	–	6	–	0	2	–	9	–	0
$ – Conference champion; Mississippi State later forfeited all 1976 wins due to NCAA violations. Kentucky retroactively announced in 1978 as SEC co-champion.; Rankings from AP Poll

The 1976 Kentucky Wildcats football team represented the University of Kentucky in the 1976 NCAA Division I football season. The Wildcats beat four different ranked teams during the season, scoring 209 points while allowing 151 points. Kentucky won the 1976 Peach Bowl and finished the season 8–4 and ranked #19 in the country.

Kentucky opened the season with a 38–13 victory over Oregon State. Next was a 16–37 loss at Kansas. The following week, Kentucky defeated West Virginia 14–10.

On October 10, Kentucky hosted #20 ranked Penn State. The 57,733 in attendance was the largest crowd ever for a football game in the state of Kentucky up to that time. Kentucky quarterback Derrick Ramsey ran for 95 yards and a touchdown; running back Chris Hill added 106 yards and a touchdown, and safety Rick Hayden had two interceptions. Kentucky held Penn State to 212 yards of total offense and won 22–6. Penn State coach Joe Paterno commented after the game, "That was a good football team we played. What can you say after you get the devil kicked out of you?"

That victory was followed by a 7–14 loss at Mississippi State, a team that would finish the season with a 9–2 record. The following week, Kentucky defeated LSU 21–7. A 7–31 loss to Georgia was next, followed by a 14–24 loss at Maryland.

Kentucky went undefeated in November, defeating Vanderbilt 14–0 and Florida 28–9, and beating Tennessee 7–0 in Knoxville.

Kentucky finished the season in the 1976 Peach Bowl against 9–2 North Carolina, ranked #18. Kentucky outgained North Carolina 334 yards to 109; the Wildcat defense held the Tar Heels to a total of five first downs and the Wildcats forced five turnovers. Kentucky won 21–0 and ended the season ranked #19 in the AP poll. In 1978, the loss to Mississippi State was vacated due to sanctions, which meant that Kentucky officially went 5–2 in SEC play and therefore was co-champion of the SEC for 1976. As of 2025, it currently is the last time Kentucky has won the SEC in football.

== Schedule ==
Date	Opponent	Site	TV	Result	Attendance	Source
September 11	Oregon State*	Commonwealth Stadium; Lexington, KY		W 38–13	56,723	
September 18	at No. 13 Kansas*	Memorial Stadium; Lawrence, KS		L 16–37	42,615–50,170	
September 25	West Virginia*	Commonwealth Stadium; Lexington, KY		W 14–10	57,703	
October 2	No. 20 Penn State*	Commonwealth Stadium; Lexington, KY		W 22–6	57,733	
October 9	at Mississippi State	Mississippi Veterans Memorial Stadium; Jackson, MS		W 7–14 (forfeit)	31,500	
October 16	No. 16 LSU	Commonwealth Stadium; Lexington, KY		W 21–7	57,695	
October 23	No. 10 Georgia	Commonwealth Stadium; Lexington, KY		L 7–31	57,733	
October 30	at No. 5 Maryland*	Byrd Stadium; College Park, MD	ABC	L 14–24	43,013	
November 6	Vanderbilt	Commonwealth Stadium; Lexington, KY (rivalry)		W 14–0	57,269	
November 13	No. 15 Florida	Commonwealth Stadium; Lexington, KY (rivalry)		W 28–9	55,000	
November 20	at Tennessee	Neyland Stadium; Knoxville, TN (rivalry)		W 7–0	80,336	
December 31	vs. No. 19 North Carolina*	Atlanta–Fulton County Stadium; Atlanta, GA (Peach Bowl)	Mizlou	W 21–0	54,132	
*Non-conference game; Rankings from AP Poll released prior to the game

== Roster ==
1976 Kentucky Wildcats football team roster
Players
Coaches
Offense

Pos.	#	Name	Class
[[American football positions|]]
[[American football positions|]]

Defense

Pos.	#	Name	Class
[[American football positions|]]

Special teams

Pos.	#	Name	Class

Head coach

Coordinators/assistant coaches

Legend

- (C) Team captain
- (S) Suspended
- (I) Ineligible
- Injured
- Redshirt

== Team players in the 1977 NFL draft ==
Player	Position	Round	Pick	NFL club
Warren Bryant	Tackle	1	6	Atlanta Falcons
Randy Burke	Wide Receiver	1	26	Baltimore Colts
