= 1976 Ole Miss Rebels football team =

American college football season

1976 Ole Miss Rebels football
- Conference: Southeastern Conference
- Record: 6–5 (3–4 SEC)
- Head coach: Ken Cooper (3rd season)
- Home stadium: Hemingway Stadium; Mississippi Veterans Memorial Stadium

1976 Southeastern Conference football standings
	Conf.					Overall
Team	W		L		T	W		L		T
No. 10 Georgia $	5	–	1	–	0	10	–	2	–	0
No. 11 Alabama	5	–	2	–	0	9	–	3	–	0
No. 20 Mississippi State	4	–	2	–	0	9	–	2	–	0
Florida	4	–	2	–	0	8	–	4	–	0
No. 18 Kentucky $	4	–	2	–	0	8	–	4	–	0
LSU	3	–	3	–	0	6	–	4	–	1
Auburn	3	–	3	–	0	4	–	7	–	0
Ole Miss	3	–	4	–	0	5	–	6	–	0
Tennessee	2	–	4	–	0	6	–	5	–	0
Vanderbilt	0	–	6	–	0	2	–	9	–	0
$ – Conference champion; Mississippi State later forfeited all 1976 wins due to NCAA violations. Kentucky retroactively announced in 1978 as SEC co-champion.; Rankings from AP Poll

The 1976 Ole Miss Rebels football team represented the University of Mississippi (Ole Miss) in the 1976 NCAA Division I football season. The Rebels were led by third-year head coach Ken Cooper and played their home games at Hemingway Stadium in Oxford, Mississippi and Mississippi Veterans Memorial Stadium in Jackson. The team competed as members of the Southeastern Conference, finishing in eighth. Highlights of the season included upset victories over top-ten ranked teams Alabama and Georgia.

== Schedule ==
Date	Opponent	Rank	Site	Result	Attendance	Source
September 4	at Memphis State*		Liberty Bowl Memorial Stadium; Memphis, TN (rivalry)	L 16–21	51,187	
September 11	No. 6 Alabama		Mississippi Veterans Memorial Stadium; Jackson, MS (rivalry)	W 10–7	47,500	
September 18	Tulane*	No. 20	Hemingway Stadium; Oxford, MS (rivalry)	W 34–7	33,231	
September 25	at Southern Miss*	No. 17	M. M. Roberts Stadium; Hattiesburg, MS	W 28–0	33,000	
October 2	Auburn	No. 16	Mississippi Veterans Memorial Stadium; Jackson, MS (rivalry)	L 0–10	40,500	
October 9	No. 4 Georgia		Hemingway Stadium; Oxford, MS	W 21–17	36,471	
October 16	at South Carolina*	No. 16	Williams–Brice Stadium; Columbia, SC	L 7–10	53,079	
October 23	at Vanderbilt		Dudley Field; Nashville, TN (rivalry)	W 20–3	23,000	
October 30	at LSU		Tiger Stadium; Baton Rouge, LA (rivalry)	L 0–45	67,350	
November 13	at Tennessee		Neyland Stadium; Knoxville, TN (rivalry)	L 6–32	79,161	
November 20	vs. Mississippi State		Mississippi Veterans Memorial Stadium; Jackson, MS (Egg Bowl)	W 11–28 (Miss. State forfeit)	46,000	
*Non-conference game; Rankings from AP Poll released prior to the game

== Roster ==
- QB Bobby Garner
- TE Ray Poole Jr.
