= 1976 NCAA Division I football season =

American college football season

- Preseason AP No. 1: Nebraska
- Regular season: September 4 – November 27, 1976
- Number of bowls: 12
- Bowl games: December 13, 1976 – January 2, 1977
- Champion(s): Pittsburgh (AP, Coaches, FWAA, NFF)
- Heisman: Pittsburgh running back Tony Dorsett

The 1976 NCAA Division I football season ended with a championship for the Panthers of the University of Pittsburgh. Led by head coach Johnny Majors (voted the AFCA Coach of the Year), the Pitt Panthers brought a college football championship to the home of the defending pro football champions, the Steelers. Pitt also had the Heisman Trophy winner, Tony Dorsett; the Panthers had been ranked ninth in the preseason AP poll.

During the 20th century, the NCAA had no playoff for major college football teams, which became Division I-A in 1978. The NCAA Football Guide, however, did note an "unofficial national champion" based on the top ranked teams in the "wire service" (AP and UPI) polls. The "writers' poll" by Associated Press (AP) was the most popular, followed by the "coaches' poll" by United Press International) (UPI). The AP poll consisted of the votes of as many as 62 writers, though not all voted in each poll, and the UPI poll was taken of a 25-member board of coaches.

== Rule changes ==
- Spearing will be called anytime the infraction occurs, previously it was called only if the official determined "malicious" intent.
- Blocking rules were liberalized, allowing half of full extension of arms within the frame of, but below the shoulder of, the opponent.

== Conference and program changes ==
School	1975 Conference	1976 Conference
Eastern Michigan Hurons	D-II Independent	MAC
Houston Cougars	Independent	Southwest
Illinois State Redbirds	D-II Independent	D-I Independent
Richmond Spiders	Southern	Independent

== September ==
In the preseason poll released on September 7, the AP ranked Nebraska first, followed by Michigan, Arizona State (the highest preseason ranking for a WAC team), Ohio State, and Oklahoma.

September 11: No. 1 Nebraska failed to win its opening game, being tied 6–6 by LSU in Baton Rouge, escaping with the stalemate only after the Bayou Bengals missed a 44-yard field goal attempt in the closing seconds. No. 2 Michigan beat Wisconsin 40–27, but No. 3 Arizona State lost its home opener 28–10 to No. 17 UCLA; after an undefeated season in 1975, the Sun Devils would finish just 4−7 this year. No. 4 Ohio State beat Michigan State 49–21, and No. 5 Oklahoma won 24–3 at Vanderbilt. Losses by No. 6 Alabama, No. 7 Texas, and No. 8 USC opened the door for No. 9 Pittsburgh to make a big jump in the next poll, and the Panthers came through with a 31–10 win at No. 11 Notre Dame. With Nebraska and Arizona State dropping to 8th and 18th, the next AP Poll featured No. 1 Michigan, No. 2 Ohio State, No. 3.Pittsburgh, No. 4 Oklahoma, and No. 5 UCLA.

September 18: The top five teams all won: No. 1 Michigan beat Stanford 51–0, and No. 2 Ohio State won 12–7 at No. 7 Penn State. No. 3 Pittsburgh beat Georgia Tech 42–14 in Atlanta, No. 4 Oklahoma beat California 28–17, and No. 5 UCLA beat Arizona 37–9. The top five remained the same in the next poll.

September 25: No. 1 Michigan crushed Navy 70–14, but No. 2 Ohio State lost 22–21 to Missouri and fell to eighth in the next poll. No. 3 Pittsburgh beat Temple 21–7, No. 4 Oklahoma beat Florida State 24–9, and No. 5 UCLA beat Air Force, 40–7. No. 6 Nebraska, which beat TCU 64–10, returned to the Top Five: No. 1 Michigan, No. 2 Pittsburgh, No. 3 Oklahoma, No. 4 UCLA, and No. 5 Nebraska.

== October ==
October 2: No. 1 Michigan beat Wake Forest 31–0, and No. 2 Pittsburgh won 44–31 at Duke. No. 3 Oklahoma won 24–10 at Iowa State, while No. 4 UCLA traveled to Columbus and played No. 8 Ohio State to a 10–10 tie. No. 5 Nebraska beat Miami (FL) 17–9, but dropped to sixth in the next poll. No. 6 Georgia shut out No. 10 Alabama 21–0 and moved up: No. 1 Michigan, No. 2 Pittsburgh, No. 3 Oklahoma, No. 4 Georgia, and No. 5 UCLA.

October 9: No. 1 Michigan defeated Michigan State 42–10, and No. 2 Pittsburgh beat Louisville 27–6. No. 3 Oklahoma played its annual game in Dallas against No. 16 Texas and wound up with a 6–6 tie. No. 4 Georgia was upset 21–17 at Mississippi, No. 5 UCLA beat Stanford 38–20, No. 6 Nebraska won 24–12 at Colorado, and No. 7 Maryland beat NC State 16–6. The next poll featured No. 1 Michigan, No. 2 Pittsburgh, No. 3 Nebraska, No. 4 UCLA, and No. 5 Maryland.

October 16: After playing its first five games at home, No. 1 Michigan traveled to Evanston and defeated Northwestern, 38–7. No. 2 Pittsburgh beat Miami (FL), 36–19. No. 3 Nebraska shut out Kansas State 51–0, No. 4 UCLA beat Washington State 62–3, but No. 5 Maryland narrowly beat Wake Forest 17–15 and fell to sixth. No. 6 Oklahoma returned to the Top Five after a 28–10 win at No. 15 Kansas. The next poll featured No. 1 Michigan, No. 2 Pittsburgh, No. 3 Nebraska, No. 4 UCLA, and No. 5 Oklahoma.

October 23: No. 1 Michigan won 35–0 at Indiana, while No. 2 Pittsburgh won 45–0 at Navy. No. 3 Nebraska lost 34–24 to No. 17 Missouri, which would finish with a 6–5 record despite their victories over USC and Ohio State as well as the Cornhuskers. No. 4 UCLA won 35–19 at California, No. 5 Oklahoma lost 31–24 at home to Oklahoma State, and No. 6 Maryland won 30–3 at Duke to reach 7–0. No. 7 USC, which had won four in a row after losing its opener to Missouri, beat Oregon State 56–0 and returned to the Top Five: No. 1 Michigan, No. 2 Pittsburgh, No. 3 UCLA, No. 4 USC, and No. 5 Maryland.

October 30: No. 1 Michigan beat Minnesota 45–0 and No. 2 Pittsburgh beat Syracuse, 23–13, as both teams reached 8–0. No. 3 UCLA won 30–21 at Washington and No. 4 USC beat California 20–6. No. 5 Maryland beat Kentucky 24–14, but fell one spot in the polls. They traded places with No. 6 Texas Tech, which had beaten No. 15 Texas 31–28. The top five were now No. 1 Michigan, No. 2 Pittsburgh, No. 3 UCLA, No. 4 USC, and No. 5 Texas Tech.

== November ==
November 6: No. 1 Michigan lost 16–14 at Purdue, and fell from the top spot. They were replaced by No. 2 Pittsburgh, which won 37–7 over Army. No. 3 UCLA beat Oregon 46–0, No. 4 USC won 48–24 at Stanford, and No. 5 Texas Tech won 14–10 at TCU. The next poll featured No. 1 Pittsburgh, No. 2 UCLA, No. 3 USC, No. 4 Michigan, and No. 5 Texas Tech.

November 13: No. 1 Pittsburgh beat West Virginia 24–16, and No. 2 UCLA won 45–14 at Oregon State to extend its record to 9–0–1. No. 3 USC beat Washington 20–3, No. 4 Michigan beat Illinois 38–7, and No. 5 Texas Tech beat SMU 34–7 to reach 8–0. The Top Five was unchanged.

November 20: While No. 1 Pittsburgh was idle, several conference championships were determined on the same day. In Los Angeles, No. 2 UCLA and No. 3 USC were both unbeaten in the Pac-8, so their crosstown game determined the conference title for the Rose Bowl berth. UCLA suffered its first loss of the season, falling to the Trojans 24–14. The same day in Columbus, Ohio, the Big Ten's two best teams were meeting to determine the other berth in the Rose Bowl. In each of the last four years, a loss or tie to Ohio State had denied Michigan the Big Ten title. This year, the No. 4-ranked Wolverines were again at a disadvantage, as they had already lost a conference game while No. 8 Ohio State was unbeaten in Big Ten play. Nevertheless, this installment of "The Ten Year War" was no contest as Michigan won 22–0 over the Buckeyes and earned the conference championship. The Southwest Conference title came down to a meeting between No. 5 Texas Tech and No. 9 Houston. The visiting Cougars, in their very first year of SWC membership, beat the previously undefeated Red Raiders 27–19 to take over first place in the conference; they would win their remaining games to earn a spot in the Cotton Bowl. Their opponent would be No. 6 Maryland, which closed an 11–0 regular season with a 28–0 win at Virginia to earn the outright ACC championship. The next poll featured No. 1 Pittsburgh, No. 2 Michigan, No. 3 USC, No. 4 Georgia (which was idle this week but had already clinched the SEC title), and No. 5 Maryland.

Top-ranked Pittsburgh was invited to play in the Sugar Bowl after the players took a vote and made it clear that they would prefer to play SEC champion Georgia there rather than face lower-ranked Big 8 co-champion Colorado in the Orange Bowl. The Orange Bowl then controversially selected Big 10 runner-up Ohio State to play Colorado over Pac-8 runner-up UCLA, even though the Bruins had a better record and higher ranking than the Buckeyes. It was believed that Ohio State would bring more fans to Miami for the warm weather than UCLA would, and Orange Bowl officials did not like the prospect of a UCLA-Colorado matchup as it would be two schools from the west playing back east.

November 27: No. 1 Pittsburgh moved its game against No. 16 Penn State from its campus to Three Rivers Stadium. Pitt had not beaten the Nittany Lions in its last ten meetings, but this time the Panthers cruised to a 24–7 win on the night after Thanksgiving. Tony Dorsett, who rushed for 224 yards and scored two of Pitt's touchdowns, broke the record for yards in a season (1,948) and became the first college player to reach 6,000 yards rushing in a career, closing with 6,082. He would be awarded the Heisman Trophy the following week. No. 2 Michigan and No. 5 Maryland had already finished their seasons, but No. 3 USC won 17–13 over Notre Dame and No. 4 Georgia defeated Georgia Tech 13−10. The final regular season poll featured No. 1 Pittsburgh, No. 2 Michigan, No. 3 USC, No. 4 Maryland, and No. 5 Georgia.

== Conference standings ==
1976 Atlantic Coast Conference football standings
	Conf.					Overall
Team	W		L		T	W		L		T
No. 8 Maryland $	5	–	0	–	0	11	–	1	–	0
North Carolina	4	–	1	–	0	9	–	3	–	0
Wake Forest	3	–	3	–	0	5	–	6	–	0
Duke	2	–	3	–	1	5	–	5	–	1
NC State	2	–	3	–	0	3	–	7	–	1
Virginia	1	–	3	–	0	2	–	9	–	0
Clemson	0	–	4	–	1	3	–	6	–	2
$ – Conference champion; Rankings from AP Poll

1976 Big Eight Conference football standings
	Conf.					Overall
Team	W		L		T	W		L		T
No. 16 Colorado +	5	–	2	–	0	8	–	4	–	0
No. 14 Oklahoma State +	5	–	2	–	0	9	–	3	–	0
No. 5 Oklahoma +	5	–	2	–	0	9	–	2	–	1
No. 19 Iowa State	4	–	3	–	0	8	–	3	–	0
No. 9 Nebraska	4	–	3	–	0	9	–	3	–	1
Missouri	3	–	4	–	0	6	–	5	–	0
Kansas	2	–	5	–	0	6	–	5	–	0
Kansas State	0	–	7	–	0	1	–	10	–	0
+ – Conference co-champions; Rankings from AP Poll

1976 Big Ten Conference football standings
	Conf.					Overall
Team	W		L		T	W		L		T
No. 3 Michigan +	7	–	1	–	0	10	–	2	–	0
No. 6 Ohio State +	7	–	1	–	0	9	–	2	–	1
Minnesota	4	–	4	–	0	6	–	5	–	0
Illinois	4	–	4	–	0	5	–	6	–	0
Indiana	4	–	4	–	0	5	–	6	–	0
Purdue	4	–	4	–	0	5	–	6	–	0
Iowa	3	–	5	–	0	5	–	6	–	0
Wisconsin	3	–	5	–	0	5	–	6	–	0
Michigan State	3	–	5	–	0	4	–	6	–	1
Northwestern	1	–	7	–	0	1	–	10	–	0
+ – Conference co-champions; Rankings from AP Poll

1976 Ivy League football standings
	Conf.					Overall
Team	W		L		T	W		L		T
Yale +	6	–	1	–	0	8	–	1	–	0
Brown +	6	–	1	–	0	8	–	1	–	0
Harvard	4	–	3	–	0	6	–	3	–	0
Dartmouth	4	–	3	–	0	6	–	3	–	0
Columbia	2	–	5	–	0	3	–	6	–	0
Penn	2	–	5	–	0	3	–	6	–	0
Princeton	2	–	5	–	0	2	–	7	–	0
Cornell	2	–	5	–	0	2	–	7	–	0
+ – Conference co-champions

1976 Mid-American Conference football standings
	Conf.					Overall
Team	W		L		T	W		L		T
Ball State $	4	–	1	–	0	8	–	3	–	0
Kent State	6	–	2	–	0	8	–	4	–	0
Ohio	6	–	2	–	0	7	–	4	–	0
Western Michigan	6	–	3	–	0	7	–	4	–	0
Central Michigan	4	–	3	–	0	7	–	4	–	0
Bowling Green	4	–	3	–	0	6	–	5	–	0
Miami (OH)	2	–	4	–	0	3	–	8	–	0
Toledo	2	–	6	–	0	3	–	8	–	0
Eastern Michigan	1	–	5	–	0	2	–	9	–	0
Northern Illinois	0	–	6	–	0	1	–	10	–	0
$ – Conference champion

1976 Missouri Valley Conference football standings
	Conf.					Overall
Team	W		L		T	W		L		T
Tulsa +	2	–	1	–	1	7	–	4	–	1
New Mexico State +	2	–	1	–	1	4	–	6	–	1
West Texas State	1	–	1	–	2	4	–	5	–	2
Wichita State	2	–	2	–	0	4	–	7	–	0
Drake	1	–	3	–	0	1	–	10	–	0
+ – Conference co-champions

1976 Pacific Coast Athletic Association football standings
	Conf.					Overall
Team	W		L		T	W		L		T
San Jose State $	4	–	0	–	0	7	–	4	–	0
Fresno State	3	–	1	–	0	5	–	6	–	0
Long Beach State	2	–	2	–	0	8	–	3	–	0
Cal State Fullerton	1	–	3	–	0	3	–	7	–	1
Pacific (CA)	0	–	4	–	0	2	–	9	–	0
$ – Conference champion

1976 Pacific-8 Conference football standings
	Conf.					Overall
Team	W		L		T	W		L		T
No. 2 USC $	7	–	0	–	0	11	–	1	–	0
No. 15 UCLA	6	–	1	–	0	9	–	2	–	1
Stanford	5	–	2	–	0	6	–	5	–	0
California	3	–	4	–	0	5	–	6	–	0
Washington	3	–	4	–	0	5	–	6	–	0
Washington State	2	–	5	–	0	3	–	8	–	0
Oregon	1	–	6	–	0	4	–	7	–	0
Oregon State	1	–	6	–	0	2	–	10	–	0
$ – Conference champion; Rankings from AP Poll

1976 Southern Conference football standings
	Conf.					Overall
Team	W		L		T	W		L		T
East Carolina $	4	–	1	–	0	9	–	2	–	0
William & Mary	3	–	2	–	0	7	–	4	–	0
Appalachian State	2	–	2	–	1	6	–	4	–	1
Furman	2	–	2	–	1	6	–	4	–	1
VMI	2	–	3	–	0	5	–	5	–	0
The Citadel	1	–	4	–	0	6	–	5	–	0
Davidson	0	–	0	–	0	2	–	6	–	1
$ – Conference champion

1976 Southeastern Conference football standings
	Conf.					Overall
Team	W		L		T	W		L		T
No. 10 Georgia $	5	–	1	–	0	10	–	2	–	0
No. 11 Alabama	5	–	2	–	0	9	–	3	–	0
No. 20 Mississippi State	4	–	2	–	0	9	–	2	–	0
Florida	4	–	2	–	0	8	–	4	–	0
No. 18 Kentucky $	4	–	2	–	0	8	–	4	–	0
LSU	3	–	3	–	0	6	–	4	–	1
Auburn	3	–	3	–	0	4	–	7	–	0
Ole Miss	3	–	4	–	0	5	–	6	–	0
Tennessee	2	–	4	–	0	6	–	5	–	0
Vanderbilt	0	–	6	–	0	2	–	9	–	0
$ – Conference champion; Mississippi State later forfeited all 1976 wins due to NCAA violations. Kentucky retroactively announced in 1978 as SEC co-champion.; Rankings from AP Poll

1976 Southland Conference football standings
	Conf.					Overall
Team	W		L		T	W		L		T
McNeese State $	4	–	1	–	0	10	–	2	–	0
Southwestern Louisiana	4	–	1	–	0	7	–	4	–	0
UT Arlington	3	–	2	–	0	5	–	6	–	0
Louisiana Tech	2	–	3	–	0	6	–	5	–	0
Arkansas State	2	–	3	–	0	5	–	6	–	0
Lamar	0	–	5	–	0	2	–	9	–	0
$ – Conference champion; Southwestern Louisiana forfeited 2 non-conference season wins.

1976 Southwest Conference football standings
	Conf.					Overall
Team	W		L		T	W		L		T
No. 4 Houston +	7	–	1	–	0	10	–	2	–	0
No. 13 Texas Tech +	7	–	1	–	0	10	–	2	–	0
No. 7 Texas A&M	6	–	2	–	0	10	–	2	–	0
Baylor	4	–	3	–	1	7	–	3	–	1
Texas	4	–	4	–	0	5	–	5	–	1
Arkansas	3	–	4	–	1	5	–	5	–	1
Rice	2	–	6	–	0	3	–	8	–	0
SMU	2	–	6	–	0	3	–	8	–	0
TCU	0	–	8	–	0	0	–	11	–	0
+ – Conference co-champions; Rankings from AP Poll

1976 Western Athletic Conference football standings
	Conf.					Overall
Team	W		L		T	W		L		T
BYU +	6	–	1	–	0	9	–	3	–	0
Wyoming +	6	–	1	–	0	8	–	4	–	0
Arizona State	4	–	3	–	0	4	–	7	–	0
Utah	3	–	3	–	0	3	–	8	–	0
Arizona	3	–	4	–	0	5	–	6	–	0
New Mexico	3	–	4	–	0	4	–	7	–	0
Colorado State	2	–	4	–	0	6	–	5	–	0
UTEP	0	–	7	–	0	1	–	11	–	0
+ – Conference co-champions

1976 NCAA Division I independents football records
	Conf.			Overall
Team	W	L	T	W		L		T
No. 1 Pittsburgh		–		12	–	0	–	0
No. 17 Rutgers		–		11	–	0	–	0
San Diego State		–		10	–	1	–	0
No. 12 Notre Dame		–		9	–	3	–	0
Colgate		–		8	–	2	–	0
Boston College		–		8	–	3	–	0
Cincinnati		–		8	–	3	–	0
Memphis State		–		7	–	4	–	0
North Texas State *		–		7	–	4	–	0
Southern Illinois		–		7	–	4	–	0
Penn State		–		7	–	5	–	0
Villanova		–		6	–	4	–	1
South Carolina		–		6	–	5	–	0
Virginia Tech		–		6	–	5	–	0
Army		–		5	–	6	–	0
Florida State		–		5	–	6	–	0
Illinois State		–		5	–	6	–	0
Richmond		–		5	–	6	–	0
West Virginia		–		5	–	6	–	0
Georgia Tech		–		4	–	6	–	1
Temple		–		4	–	6	–	0
Air Force		–		4	–	7	–	0
Dayton		–		4	–	7	–	0
Louisville		–		4	–	7	–	0
Marshall		–		4	–	7	–	0
Navy		–		4	–	7	–	0
Indiana State		–		3	–	7	–	0
Hawaii		–		3	–	8	–	0
Holy Cross		–		3	–	8	–	0
Miami (FL)		–		3	–	8	–	0
Syracuse		–		3	–	8	–	0
Utah State		–		3	–	8	–	0
Northeast Louisiana		–		2	–	9	–	0
Southern Miss		–		2	–	9	–	0
Tulane		–		2	–	9	–	0
North Texas State (originally 6–5) was awarded a forfeit win after Mississippi State was found to be using an ineligible player.; Rankings from AP Poll

== No. 1 and No. 2 progress ==
WEEKS	No. 1	No. 2	Event
PRE	Nebraska	Michigan	LSU 6, Nebraska 6 (Sept 11)
1-2	Michigan	Ohio State	Missouri 22, Ohio State 21 (Sept 25)
3-8	Michigan	Pittsburgh	Purdue 16, Michigan 14 (Nov 6)
9-10	Pittsburgh	UCLA	USC 24 UCLA 14 (Nov 19)
11-Final	Pittsburgh	Michigan	Pittsburgh 27, Georgia 3

== Bowl games ==
=== Major bowls ===
Saturday, January 1, 1977

At the Sugar Bowl at the Superdome in New Orleans, Pitt quarterback Matt Cavanaugh passed for 192 yards, and Dorsett had 32 carries for 202 yards, overcoming Georgia's heralded "Junkyard Dogs" defense. After taking a 21–0 lead at halftime, the Panthers cemented their number one status with a 27–3 win over Georgia. In the Cotton at Dallas, No. 6 Houston beat No. 4 Maryland 30–21, and No. 3 USC beat No. 2 Michigan 14–6 in the Rose in Pasadena. At the nightcap in Miami, Ohio State justified their Orange Bowl invitation by crushing Colorado, 27–10.

Bowl				
Sugar	No. 1 Pittsburgh Panthers	27	No. 5 Georgia Bulldogs	3
Cotton	No. 6 Houston Cougars	30	No. 4 Maryland Terrapins	21
Rose	No. 3 USC Trojans	14	No. 2 Michigan Wolverines	6
Orange	No. 11 Ohio State Buckeyes	27	No. 12 Colorado Buffaloes	10

Pittsburgh received 59 of the 62 first place votes cast to win the AP Trophy, and was ranked No. 1 by UPI as well, followed by 2.USC 3.Michigan 4.Houston and 5.Oklahoma. The other Division I unbeaten team, Rutgers (11–0), was ranked 17th in the final release of both major polls.

=== Other bowls ===
Bowl	Location	Date	Winner	Score	Runner-up
Sun	El Paso, TX	January 2	No. 10 Texas A&M	37–14	Florida
Gator	Jacksonville, FL	December 27	No. 15 Notre Dame	20–9	No. 20 Penn State
Tangerine	Orlando, FL	December 18	No. 14 Oklahoma State	49–21	Brigham Young
Fiesta	Tempe, AZ	December 25	No. 8 Oklahoma	41–7	Wyoming
Astro-Bluebonnet	Houston, TX	December 31	No. 13 Nebraska	27–24	No. 9 Texas Tech
Liberty	Memphis, TN	December 20	No. 16 Alabama	36–6	No. 7 UCLA
Peach	Atlanta, GA	December 31	Kentucky	21–0	No. 19 North Carolina
Independence	Shreveport, LA	December 13	McNeese State	20–16	Tulsa

== Heisman Trophy voting ==
The Heisman Trophy is given to the year's most outstanding player

Player	School	Position	1st	2nd	3rd	Total
Tony Dorsett	Pittsburgh	RB	701	112	30	2,357
Ricky Bell	USC	RB	73	485	157	1,346
Rob Lytle	Michigan	RB	35	85	138	413
Terry Miller	Oklahoma State	RB	18	43	57	197
Tommy Kramer	Rice	QB	6	7	31	63
Gifford Nielsen	BYU	QB	1	7	28	45
Ray Goff	Georgia	QB	2	12	14	44
Mike Voight	North Carolina	RB	1	7	24	41
Joe Roth	California	QB	0	6	20	32
Jeff Dankworth	UCLA	QB	2	6	13	31

== See also ==
- 1976 College Football All-America Team
- 1976 NCAA Division II football season
- 1976 NCAA Division III football season
