= 1976 NCAA Division I football rankings =

- Season: 1976
- Bowl season: 1976–77 bowl games
- Preseason No. 1: Nebraska
- End of season champions: Pittsburgh

Two human polls comprised the 1976 National Collegiate Athletic Association (NCAA) Division I football rankings. Unlike most sports, college football's governing body, the NCAA, does not bestow a national championship, instead that title is bestowed by one or more different polling agencies. There are two main weekly polls that begin in the preseason—the AP Poll and the Coaches Poll.

== Legend ==
	Increase in ranking
	Decrease in ranking
	Not ranked previous week
	National champion
(#–#)	Win–loss record
(Italics)	Number of first place votes
т	Tied with team above or below also with this symbol

== AP Poll ==
	Preseason Aug	Week 1 Sep 14	Week 2 Sep 21	Week 3 Sep 28	Week 4 Oct 5	Week 5 Oct 12	Week 6 Oct 19	Week 7 Oct 26	Week 8 Nov 2	Week 9 Nov 9	Week 10 Nov 16	Week 11 Nov 23	Week 12 Nov 30	Week 13 (Final) Jan	
1.	Nebraska (25)	Michigan (1–0) (28)	Michigan (2–0) (47)	Michigan (3–0) (56)	Michigan (4–0) (52)	Michigan (5–0) (57)	Michigan (6–0) (58)	Michigan (7–0) (53)	Michigan (8–0) (57)	Pittsburgh (9–0) (49)	Pittsburgh (10–0) (44)	Pittsburgh (10–0) (39)	Pittsburgh (11–0) (45)	Pittsburgh (12–0) (59)	1.
2.	Michigan (10)	Ohio State (1–0) (18)	Ohio State (2–0) (3)	Pittsburgh (3–0) (2)	Pittsburgh (4–0) (3)	Pittsburgh (5–0) (3)	Pittsburgh (6–0) (4)	Pittsburgh (7–0) (6)	Pittsburgh (8–0) (5)	UCLA (8–0–1) (7)	UCLA (9–0–1) (13)	Michigan (10–1) (13)	Michigan (10–1) (8)	USC (11–1) (3)	2.
3.	Arizona State (7)	Pittsburgh (1–0) (9)	Pittsburgh (2–0) (7)	Oklahoma (3–0) (2)	Oklahoma (4–0) (3)	Nebraska (4–0–1)	Nebraska (5–0–1)	UCLA (6–0–1)	UCLA (7–0–1)	USC (7–1) (2)	USC (8–1) (1)	USC (9–1) (7)	USC (10–1) (3)	Michigan (10–2)	3.
4.	Ohio State (3)	Oklahoma (1–0) (4)	Oklahoma (2–0) (3)	UCLA (3–0)	Georgia (4–0) (2)	UCLA (4–0–1)	UCLA (5–0–1)	USC (5–1)	USC (6–1)	Michigan (8–1) (2)	Michigan (9–1) (2)	Georgia (9–1) (1)	Maryland (11–0) (2)	Houston (10–2)	4.
5.	Oklahoma (6)	UCLA (1–0) (2)	UCLA (2–0)	Nebraska (2–0–1)	UCLA (3–0–1)	Maryland (5–0)	Oklahoma (5–0–1)	Maryland (7–0)	Texas Tech (6–0)	Texas Tech (7–0) (1)	Texas Tech (8–0) (1)	Maryland (11–0) (2)	Georgia (10–1)	Oklahoma (9–2–1)	5.
6.	Alabama (3)	Missouri (1–0)	Nebraska (1–0–1)	Georgia (3–0)	Nebraska (3–0–1)	Oklahoma (4–0–1)	Maryland (6–0)	Texas Tech (5–0) (1)	Maryland (8–0)	Maryland (9–0) (2)	Georgia (9–1) т	UCLA (9–1–1)	Houston (8–2)	Ohio State (9–2–1)	6.
7.	Texas (3)	Penn State (1–0)	Georgia (2–0)	Maryland (3–0)	Maryland (4–0)	Missouri (4–1)	USC (4–1)	Georgia (6–1)	Georgia (7–1)	Georgia (8–1)	Maryland (10–0) т	Houston (7–2)	UCLA (9–1–1)	Texas A&M (10–2)	7.
8.	USC (2)	Nebraska (0–0–1)	Maryland (2–0)	Ohio State (2–1)	Kansas (4–0)	USC (4–1)	Texas Tech (4–0)	Ohio State (5–1–1)	Ohio State (6–1–1)	Ohio State (7–1–1)	Ohio State (8–1–1)	Oklahoma (7–2–1)	Oklahoma (8–2–1)	Maryland (11–1)	8.
9.	Pittsburgh (1)	Georgia (1–0)	Texas A&M (2–0)	Kansas (3–0)	Missouri (3–1)	Ohio State (3–1–1)	Ohio State (4–1–1)	Nebraska (5–1–1)	Nebraska (6–1–1)	Nebraska (7–1–1)	Houston (6–2)	Texas Tech (8–1)	Texas Tech (9–1)	Nebraska (9–3–1)	9.
10.	Penn State	Maryland (1–0)	Kansas (3–0)	Alabama (2–1)	Ohio State (2–1–1)	Texas Tech (3–0)	Georgia (5–1)	Missouri (5–2)	Florida (6–1)	Alabama (7–2)	Oklahoma (7–2–1)	Nebraska (7–2–1)	Texas A&M (9–2)	Georgia (10–2)	10.
11.	Notre Dame	Texas A&M (1–0)	Penn State (1–1)	LSU (2–0–1)	USC (3–1)	Georgia (4–1)	Florida (4–1)	Notre Dame (5–1)	Notre Dame (6–1)	Missouri (6–3)	Texas A&M (7–2) (1)	Texas A&M (8–2)	Ohio State (8–2–1)	Alabama (9–3)	11.
12.	Maryland	Arkansas (1–0)	Arkansas (2–0)	Missouri (2–1)	Florida (3–1)	Florida (3–1)	Notre Dame (4–1)	Florida (5–1)	Arkansas (5–1)	Houston (6–2)	Nebraska (7–2–1)	Ohio State (8–2–1)	Colorado (8–3)	Notre Dame (9–3)	12.
13.	Arkansas	Kansas (2–0)	Alabama (1–1)	USC (2–1)	Boston College (3–0)	Texas (2–1–1)	Texas (2–1–1)	Oklahoma (5–1–1)	Oklahoma State (5–2)	Arkansas (5–1–1)	Notre Dame (7–2)	Notre Dame (8–2)	Nebraska (7–3–1)	Texas Tech (10–2)	13.
14.	Texas A&M	Alabama (0–1)	Illinois (2–0)	North Carolina (4–0)	Notre Dame (3–1)	Notre Dame (3–1)	Houston (4–1)	Arkansas (4–1)	Colorado (6–2)	Oklahoma (6–2–1)	Iowa State (8–2)	Colorado (8–3) т	Oklahoma State (8–3)	Oklahoma State (9–3)	14.
15.	California	Boston College (1–0)	LSU (1–0–1)	Boston College (2–0)	Texas Tech (2–0)	Kansas (4–1)	Arkansas (3–1)	Texas (3–1–1)	Alabama (6–2)	Florida (6–2)	Colorado (7–3)	Oklahoma State (7–3) т	Notre Dame (8–3)	UCLA (9–2–1)	15.
16.	Georgia	LSU (0–0–1)	North Carolina (3–0)	Ole Miss (3–1)	Texas (2–1)	LSU (3–1–1) т	Iowa State (5–1)	Oklahoma State (4–2)	Missouri (5–3)	Texas A&M (6–2)	Oklahoma State (6–3)	Penn State (7–3)	Alabama (8–3)	Colorado (8–4)	16.
17.	UCLA	North Carolina (2–0)	Ole Miss (2–1)	Texas Tech (2–0)	Texas A&M (3–1)	Ole Miss (4–2) т	Missouri (4–2)	Alabama (5–2)	Oklahoma (5–2–1)	Oklahoma State (5–3)	Penn State (7–3)	Rutgers (10–0)	Rutgers (11–0)	Rutgers (11–0)	17.
18.	Florida	Arizona State (0–1)	Boston College (1–0)	Notre Dame (2–1)	Arkansas (3–1)	Arkansas (3–1)	Alabama (4–2)	Mississippi State (6–1)	Texas A&M (6–2)	Notre Dame (6–2)	Alabama (7–3)	Alabama (7–3)	Baylor (7–2–1)	Kentucky (8–4)	18.
19.	Kansas	Texas (0–1)	USC (1–1)	Florida (2–1)	North Carolina (4–1)	Houston (3–1)	South Carolina (5–2)	Colorado (5–2)	Houston (5–2)	Colorado (6–3)	Missouri (6–4) т	Mississippi State (9–2) т	North Carolina (9–2)	Iowa State (8–3)	19.
20.	Miami (OH)	Ole Miss (1–1)	Texas Tech (2–0)	Penn State (1–2)	LSU (2–1–1)	Alabama (3–2)	East Carolina (6–0) т; Mississippi State (5–1) т	Cincinnati (5–1)	Texas (3–2–1)	South Carolina (6–3)	Rutgers (10–0) т	North Carolina (9–2) т	Mississippi State (9–2) т; Penn State (7–4) т	Mississippi State (9–2)	20.
	Preseason Aug	Week 1 Sep 14	Week 2 Sep 21	Week 3 Sep 28	Week 4 Oct 5	Week 5 Oct 12	Week 6 Oct 19	Week 7 Oct 26	Week 8 Nov 2	Week 9 Nov 9	Week 10 Nov 16	Week 11 Nov 23	Week 12 Nov 30	Week 13 (Final) Jan	
		Dropped: California; Florida; Miami (OH); Notre Dame; USC	Dropped: Arizona State; Missouri; Texas	Dropped: Arkansas; Illinois; Texas A&M	Dropped: Alabama; Ole Miss; Penn State	Dropped: Boston College; North Carolina; Texas A&M	Dropped: Kansas; LSU; Ole Miss	Dropped: East Carolina; Houston; Iowa State; South Carolina	Dropped: Cincinnati; Mississippi State	Dropped: Texas	Dropped: Arkansas; Florida; South Carolina	Dropped: Iowa State; Missouri	None	Dropped: Baylor; North Carolina; Penn State	

== Coaches Poll ==
	Week 1 Sep 13	Week 2 Sep 20	Week 3 Sep 27	Week 4 Oct 4	Week 5 Oct 11	Week 6 Oct 18	Week 7 Oct 25	Week 8 Nov 1 (Note: Less than 20 teams received votes in this poll.)	Week 9 Nov 8	Week 10 Nov 15	Week 11 Nov 22	Week 12 Nov 29	Week 13 Jan 4 (Final)	
1.	Ohio State (1–0)	Michigan (2–0)	Michigan (3–0)	Michigan (4–0)	Michigan (5–0)	Michigan (6–0)	Michigan (7–0)	Michigan (8–0)	Pittsburgh (9–0)	Pittsburgh (10–0)	Pittsburgh (10–0)	Pittsburgh (11–0)	Pittsburgh (12–0) (39)	1.
2.	Michigan (1–0)	Ohio State (2–0)	UCLA (3–0)	Pittsburgh (4–0)	Pittsburgh (5–0)	Pittsburgh (6–0)	Pittsburgh (7–0)	Pittsburgh (8–0)	UCLA (8–0–1)	UCLA (9–0–1)	USC (9–1)	Michigan (10–1)	USC (11–1) (3)	2.
3.	UCLA (1–0)	Pittsburgh (2–0)	Pittsburgh (3–0)	Oklahoma (4–0)	Nebraska (4–0–1)	Nebraska (5–0–1)	UCLA (6–0–1)	UCLA (7–0–1)	USC (7–1)	USC (8–1)	Michigan (10–1)	USC (10–1)	Michigan (10–2)	3.
4.	Pittsburgh (1–0)	UCLA (2–0)	Oklahoma (3–0)	Georgia (4–0)	UCLA (4–0–1)	UCLA (5–0–1)	USC (5–1)	USC (6–1)	Michigan (8–1)	Michigan (9–1)	Georgia (9–1)	Georgia (10–1)	Houston (10–2)	4.
5.	Oklahoma (1–0)	Oklahoma (2–0)	Nebraska (2–0–1)	Nebraska (3–0–1)	Oklahoma (4–0–1)	Oklahoma (5–0–1)	Maryland (7–0)	Texas Tech (6–0)	Texas Tech (7–0)	Texas Tech (8–0)	Maryland (11–0)	Maryland (11–0)	Ohio State (9–2–1)	5.
6.	Missouri (1–0)	Nebraska (1–0–1)	Georgia (3–0)	UCLA (3–0–1)	Maryland (5–0)	USC (4–1)	Texas Tech (5–0)	Maryland (8–0)	Georgia (8–1)	Georgia (9–1)	UCLA (9–1–1)	UCLA (9–1–1)	Oklahoma (9–2–1)	6.
7.	Penn State (1–0)	Georgia (2–0)	Maryland (3–0)	Maryland (4–0)	Missouri (4–1)	Maryland (6–0)	Georgia (6–1)	Ohio State (6–1–1)	Maryland (9–0)	Maryland (10–0)	Houston (7–2)	Houston (8–2)	Nebraska (8–3–1)	7.
8.	Nebraska (0–0–1)	Maryland (2–0)	Ohio State (2–1)	Kansas (4–0)	USC (4–1)	Ohio State (4–1–1)	Ohio State (5–1–1)	Georgia (7–1)	Ohio State (7–1–1)	Ohio State (8–1–1)	Nebraska (7–2–1)	Texas Tech (9–1)	Texas A&M (10–2)	8.
9.	Georgia (1-0)	Texas A&M (2–0)	Alabama (2–1)	Missouri (3–1)	Ohio State (3–1–1)	Texas Tech (4–0)	Nebraska (5–1–1)	Nebraska (6–1–1)	Nebraska (7–1–1)	Oklahoma (7–2–1)	Ohio State (8–2–1)	Oklahoma (8–2–1)	Alabama (9–3)	9.
10.	Texas A&M (1–0)	Penn State (1–1)	Missouri (2–1)	USC (3–1)	Texas Tech (3–0)	Georgia (5–1)	Missouri (5–2)	Florida (6–1)	Missouri (6–3)	Iowa State (8–2)	Texas Tech (8–1)	Ohio State (8–2–1) т	Georgia (10–2)	10.
11.	Maryland (1–0)	Arkansas (2–0)	Kansas (3–0)	Ohio State (2–1–1)	Georgia (4–1)	Florida (4–1)	Notre Dame (5–1)	Notre Dame (6–1–1)	Houston (6–2)	Nebraska (7–2–1)	Notre Dame (8–2)	Texas A&M (9–2) т	Maryland (11–1)	11.
12.	Arkansas (1–0)	Kansas (3–0)	USC (2–1)	Notre Dame (3–1)	Florida (3–1)	Notre Dame (4–1)	Florida (5–1)	Oklahoma State (5–2)	Alabama (7–2)	Texas A&M (7–2)	Texas A&M (8–2)	Colorado (8–3)	Notre Dame (9–3)	12.
13.	Alabama (0–1)	Alabama (1–1)	LSU (2–0–1)	Florida (3–1)	Notre Dame (3–1)	Texas (2–1–1)	Oklahoma (5–1–1)	Colorado (6–2)	Tulsa (6–2)	Houston (6–2)	Oklahoma (7–2–1)	Notre Dame (8–3)	Texas Tech (10–2)	13.
14.	LSU (0–0–1)	Illinois (2–0)	North Carolina (4–0)	Texas (2–1)	Texas (2–1–1)	Houston (4–1)	Arkansas (4–1)	Arkansas (5–1)	Oklahoma (6–2–1)	Notre Dame (7–2)	Oklahoma State (7–3)	Oklahoma State (8–3)	Oklahoma State (9–3)	14.
15.	Boston College (1–0)	LSU (1–0–1) т	Notre Dame (2–1)	Arkansas (3–1)	Houston (3–1)	Arkansas (3–1)	Oklahoma State (4–2)	Alabama (6–2)	Florida (6–2)	Tulsa (7–2)	Colorado (8–3)	Rutgers (11–0) т	UCLA (9–2–1)	15.
16.	Kansas (2–0) т	USC (1–1) т	Boston College (2–0)	Texas A&M (3–1)	Arkansas (3–1)	Missouri (4–2)	Colorado (5–2)	Tulsa (5–2)	Iowa State (7–2) т	Colorado (7–3)	Rutgers (10–0) т	Alabama (8–3) т	Colorado (8–4)	16.
17.	North Carolina (2-0) т	Boston College (1–0)	Florida (2–1)	Boston College (3–0)	Tulsa (4–1)	Cincinnati (6–0)	Texas (3–1–1)	Houston (5–2)	Arkansas (6–1–1) т	Oklahoma State (6–3)	BYU (9–2) т	BYU (9–2) т	Rutgers (11–0)	17.
18.	Texas Tech (1–0) т	North Carolina (3–0)	Houston (2–1)	Texas Tech (2–0)	Kansas (4–1)	Iowa State (5–1)	Alabama (5–2) т		Baylor (4–2–1)	Rutgers (10–0)	Baylor (6–2–1)	Baylor (7–2–1) т	Iowa State (8–3)	18.
19.	USC (0–1)	Florida (1–1) т	Tulsa (3–1)	Houston (2–1)	Oklahoma State (3–1)	Colorado (4–2)	Boston College (5–1) т		Notre Dame (6–2) т	BYU (8–2) т	Florida (7–3)	Nebraska (7–3–1)	Baylor (7–3–1) т	19.
20.	Oklahoma State (1–0)	Texas Tech (1–0) т	Texas (1–1)	Tulsa (4–1)	Ole Miss (4–2)	Alabama (4–2)	Cincinnati (6–0) т		BYU (7–2) т; Wyoming (7–2) т	Wyoming (8–2) т	Penn State (7–3)	Florida (8–3)	Kentucky (8–4) т	20.
	Week 1 Sep 13	Week 2 Sep 20	Week 3 Sep 27	Week 4 Oct 4	Week 5 Oct 11	Week 6 Oct 18	Week 7 Oct 25	Week 8 Nov 1	Week 9 Nov 8	Week 10 Nov 15	Week 11 Nov 22	Week 12 Nov 29	Week 13 Jan 4 (Final)	
		Dropped: Missouri; Oklahoma State	Dropped: Texas A&M; Penn State; Arkansas; Illinois; Texas Tech	Dropped: Alabama; LSU; North Carolina	Dropped: Texas A&M; Boston College	Dropped: Tulsa; Kansas; Oklahoma State; Ole Miss	Dropped: Houston; Iowa State	Dropped: Missouri; Oklahoma; Texas; Boston College; Cincinnati	Dropped: Oklahoma State; Colorado	Dropped: Missouri; Alabama; Florida; Arkansas; Baylor	Dropped: Iowa State; Tulsa; Wyoming	Dropped: Penn State	Dropped: BYU; Florida	
