= 1976 USC Trojans football team =

American college football season

1976 USC Trojans football

National champion (multiple selectors) Pac-8 champion Rose Bowl champion

Rose Bowl, W 14–6 vs. Michigan
- Conference: Pacific-8 Conference

Ranking
- Coaches: No. 2
- AP: No. 2
- Record: 11–1 (7–0 Pac-8)
- Head coach: John Robinson (1st season)
- Captains: Ricky Bell; Vince Evans; Eric Williams
- Home stadium: Los Angeles Memorial Coliseum

1976 Pacific-8 Conference football standings
	Conf.					Overall
Team	W		L		T	W		L		T
No. 2 USC $	7	–	0	–	0	11	–	1	–	0
No. 15 UCLA	6	–	1	–	0	9	–	2	–	1
Stanford	5	–	2	–	0	6	–	5	–	0
California	3	–	4	–	0	5	–	6	–	0
Washington	3	–	4	–	0	5	–	6	–	0
Washington State	2	–	5	–	0	3	–	8	–	0
Oregon	1	–	6	–	0	4	–	7	–	0
Oregon State	1	–	6	–	0	2	–	10	–	0
$ – Conference champion; Rankings from AP Poll

The 1976 USC Trojans football team represented the University of Southern California (USC) in the 1976 NCAA Division I football season. In their first year under head coach John Robinson, the Trojans compiled an 11–1 record (7–0 against conference opponents), won the Pacific-8 Conference (Pac-8) championship, defeated Michigan in the 1977 Rose Bowl, and outscored their opponents by a combined total of 386 to 139. The team was ranked #2 in both the final AP Poll and the final UPI Coaches Poll.

Quarterback Vince Evans led the team in passing, completing 95 of 177 passes for 1,440 yards with ten touchdowns and six interceptions. Ricky Bell led the team in rushing with 280 carries for 1,433 yards and 14 touchdowns. Shelton Diggs led the team in receiving with 37 catches for 655 yards and eight touchdowns.

The team was named national champion by Berryman, Billingsley MOV, DeVold, Dunkel, Football Research, and Matthews, all NCAA-designated major selectors.

== Schedule ==
Date	Opponent	Rank	Site	TV	Result	Attendance	Source
September 11	Missouri*	No. 8	Los Angeles Memorial Coliseum; Los Angeles, CA		L 25–46	49,535	
September 18	at Oregon		Autzen Stadium; Eugene, OR		W 53–0	40,600	
September 25	at Purdue*	No. 19	Ross–Ade Stadium; West Lafayette, IN		W 31–13	65,425	
October 2	Iowa*	No. 13	Los Angeles Memorial Coliseum; Los Angeles, CA		W 55–0	55,518	
October 9	at Washington State	No. 11	Kingdome; Seattle, WA		W 23–14	37,268	
October 23	Oregon State^{†}	No. 7	Los Angeles Memorial Coliseum; Los Angeles, CA		W 56–0	53,216	
October 30	California	No. 4	Los Angeles Memorial Coliseum; Los Angeles, CA		W 20–6	60,323	
November 6	at Stanford	No. 4	Stanford Stadium; Stanford, CA (rivalry)		W 48–24	76,500	
November 13	Washington	No. 3	Los Angeles Memorial Coliseum; Los Angeles, CA		W 20–3	49,264	
November 20	at No. 2 UCLA	No. 3	Los Angeles Memorial Coliseum; Los Angeles, CA (Victory Bell)	ABC	W 24–14	90,519	
November 27	No. 13 Notre Dame*	No. 3	Los Angeles Memorial Coliseum; Los Angeles, CA (rivalry)	ABC	W 17–13	76,561	
January 1, 1977	vs. No. 2 Michigan*	No. 3	Rose Bowl; Pasadena, CA (Rose Bowl)	NBC	W 14–6	106,182	
*Non-conference game; ^{†}Homecoming; Rankings from AP Poll released prior to the game

== Game summaries ==
=== At Purdue ===
#19 USC Trojans (1–1) at Purdue Boilermakers (1–1)

Quarter	1	2	3	4	Total
USC	7	0	14	10	31
Purdue	7	0	6	0	13

at Ross–Ade Stadium, West Lafayette, Indiana

- Date: September 25
- Game attendance: 65,425

Game information

First quarter

- USC – Mosi Tatupu 1-yard run (Glen Walker kick). USC 7–0. Drive:
- PUR – Scott Dierking 2-yard run (Turner kick). Tie 7–7. Drive:

Second quarter

- No scoring

Third quarter

- USC – Ricky Bell 5-yard run (Glen Walker kick). USC 14–7. Drive:
- USC – Simmrin 4-yard pass from Vince Evans (Glen Walker kick). USC 21–7. Drive:
- PUR – Skibinski 1-yard run (kick failed). USC 21–13. Drive:

Fourth quarter

- USC – Mosi Tatupu 27-yard run (Glen Walker kick). USC 28–13. Drive:
- USC – Glen Walker 44-yard field goal. USC 31–13. Drive:

Top passers

- USC – Vince Evans – 168 yards, TD
- PUR

Top rushers

- USC – Ricky Bell – 37 rushes, 177 yards, TD
- PUR

Top receivers

- USC
- PUR

=== At Washington State ===
#11 USC Trojans (3–1) at Washington State Cougars (1–3)

Quarter	1	2	3	4	Total
USC	0	14	0	9	23
Washington State	0	7	0	7	14

at Kingdome, Seattle, Washington

- Date: October 9
- Game weather: Indoors (dome)
- Game attendance: 37,268

Game information

First quarter

- No scoring

Second quarter

- USC – Ricky Bell 1-yard run (Glen Walker kick). USC 7–0. Drive:
- USC – Shelton Diggs 55-yard pass from Vince Evans (Glen Walker kick, 6:23. USC 14–0. Drive:
- WSU – Harold Gillum 4-yard run (Chuck Diedrick kick). USC 14–7. Drive:

Third quarter

- No scoring

Fourth quarter

- WSU – Brian Kelly 23-yard pass from Jack Thompson (Chuck Diedrick kick). Tie 14–14. Drive:
- USC – Glen Walker 26-yard field goal, 9:26. USC 17–14. Drive:
- USC – Ricky Bell 9-yard run (kick failed). USC 23–14. Drive:

Top passers

- USC
- WSU – Jack Thompson – 26/48, 341 yards, TD

Top rushers

- USC – Ricky Bell – 51 rushes, 346 yards, 2 TD
- WSU

Top receivers

- USC
- WSU

=== Notre Dame ===
#13 Notre Dame Fighting Irish (8–2) at #3 USC Trojans (9–1)

Quarter	1	2	3	4	Total
Notre Dame	0	0	0	13	13
USC	0	7	7	3	17

at Los Angeles Memorial Coliseum, Los Angeles, California

- Date: November 27
- Game attendance: 76,561
- TV: ABC
- Recap/Box

Game information

First quarter

- No scoring

Second quarter

- USC – Shelton Diggs 6-yard pass from Rob Hertel (Glen Walker kick). USC 7–0. Drive: 10 plays, 67 yards.

Third quarter

- USC – Randy Simmrin 63-yard pass from Vince Evans (Glen Walker kick), 13:30. USC 14–0. Drive:

Fourth quarter

- ND – Vagas Ferguson 17-yard pass from Rusty Lisch (Dave Reeve kick), 14:06. USC 14–7. Drive: 4 plays, 68 yards.
- USC – Glen Walker 46-yard field goal. USC 17–7. Drive:
- ND – Rusty Lisch 1-yard run (two-point conversion failed). USC 17–13. Drive: 76 yards.

Top passers

- ND
- USC – Vince Evans – 6/14, 106 yards, TD

Top rushers

- ND
- USC – Ricky Bell – 21 rushes, 75 yards

Top receivers

- ND
- USC – Randy Simmrin – 6 receptions, 121 yards, TD

Ricky Bell was held to 75 yards on 21 carries but USC's passing game thrived with Vince Evans completing six of his 14 passes for 106 yards with Randy Simmrin hauling in six passes for 121 yards and Evans' touchdown pass.

== Roster ==
1976 USC Trojans football team roster
Players
Coaches
Offense

Pos.	#	Name	Class
RB	42	Ricky Bell	Sr
OL		Gary Bethel
OL		Brad Budde
RB	21	Lynn Cain	Jr
WR	26	Shelton Diggs	Sr
QB	8	Vince Evans	Sr
RB		Dave Farmer
TE	86	William Gay	Jr
QB	6	Rob Hertel	Jr
G	61	Donnie Hickman	Sr
RB		Kurt Hollmer
G	66	Pat Howell	So
RB		Vic Jackson
QB		Paul McDonald
TE		Jim Obradovich
OL		Otis Page
OL		Marvin Powell
WR		Ken Randle
WR		Mike Robinson
WR	18	Randy Simmrin	Jr
RB		Bernard Tarver
RB		Mosi Tatupu
RB	12	Charles White	Fr

Defense

Pos.	#	Name	Class
CB	44	Mike Burns	Sr
DB		Ron Bush
LB	58	Mario Celotto	Jr
LB	85	Garry Cobb	So
DT	92	Rich Dimler	So
DL		Ed Gutierrez
DB		Carter Hartwig
DT	79	Gary Jeter	Sr
DT	96	Myron Lapka	So
LB	57	David Lewis	Sr
LB	52	Rod Martin	Sr
LB	60	Clay Matthews	Jr
DB		Ricky Odom
DL		Harold Steele
DB		Clint Strozier
DB		Dennis Thurman
DL		Walt Underwood
DL		Vinny Van Dyke
DL		Eric Williams

Special teams

Pos.	#	Name	Class
K, P		Glen Walker

Head coach

- John Robinson (1st year)

Coordinators/assistant coaches

Legend

- (C) Team captain
- (S) Suspended
- (I) Ineligible
- Injured
- Redshirt

Roster
Last update: 2021-Jan-04
