= 1976 Washington State Cougars football team =

American college football season

1976 Washington State Cougars football
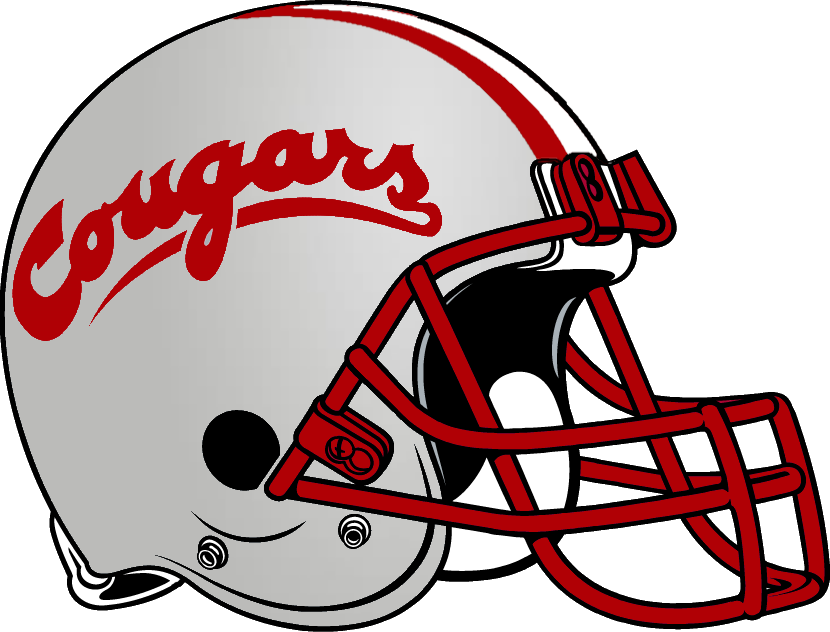
- Conference: Pacific-8 Conference
- Record: 3–8 (2–5 Pac-8)
- Head coach: Jackie Sherrill (1st season)
- Offensive coordinator: Bob Leahy (1st season)
- Defensive coordinator: Howard Tippett (1st season)
- Home stadium: Martin Stadium; Kingdome; Joe Albi Stadium

1976 Pacific-8 Conference football standings
	Conf.					Overall
Team	W		L		T	W		L		T
No. 2 USC $	7	–	0	–	0	11	–	1	–	0
No. 15 UCLA	6	–	1	–	0	9	–	2	–	1
Stanford	5	–	2	–	0	6	–	5	–	0
California	3	–	4	–	0	5	–	6	–	0
Washington	3	–	4	–	0	5	–	6	–	0
Washington State	2	–	5	–	0	3	–	8	–	0
Oregon	1	–	6	–	0	4	–	7	–	0
Oregon State	1	–	6	–	0	2	–	10	–	0
$ – Conference champion; Rankings from AP Poll

The 1976 Washington State Cougars football team was an American football team that represented Washington State University in the Pacific-8 Conference (Pac-8) during the 1976 NCAA Division I football season. In their only season under head coach Jackie Sherrill, the Cougars compiled a 3–8 record (2–5 in Pac-8, sixth), and were outscored 331 to 240.

The team's statistical leaders included Jack Thompson with 2,762 passing yards, Dan Doornink with 422 rushing yards, and Mike Levenseller with 1,124 receiving yards.

Senior quarterback John Hopkins injured a knee in the second game making a tackle; sophomore Thompson relieved him and again the following week, then became the starter for the rest of the season.

A home game was played in Seattle at the newly-opened Kingdome, against eleventh-ranked USC. Previous home games in Seattle in 1972 and 1974 were at Husky Stadium. The sole game at Joe Albi Stadium in Spokane was the Apple Cup, which was also under consideration as the Kingdome game.

Previously the defensive coordinator at Pittsburgh, Sherrill was hired in late December 1975, but coached just one season in Pullman, leaving in early December to return to the Panthers as head coach. A week later, he was succeeded at WSU by Warren Powers, the defensive backfield coach at Nebraska.

== Schedule ==
Date	Opponent	Site	Result	Attendance	Source
September 11	at No. 19 Kansas*	Memorial Stadium; Lawrence, KS	L 16–35	39,475	
September 18	at Minnesota*	Memorial Stadium; Minneapolis, MN	L 14–28	31,627	
September 25	at Wisconsin*	Camp Randall Stadium; Madison, WI	L 26–35	69,658	
October 2	Idaho*	Martin Stadium; Pullman, WA (Battle of the Palouse)	W 45–6	23,500	
October 9	No. 11 USC	Kingdome; Seattle, WA	L 14–23	37,268	
October 16	at No. 4 UCLA	Los Angeles Memorial Coliseum; Los Angeles, CA	L 3–62	35,508	
October 23	Stanford	Martin Stadium; Pullman, WA	L 16–22	24,300	
October 30	at Oregon	Autzen Stadium; Eugene, OR	W 23–22	22,200	
November 6	Oregon State^{†}	Martin Stadium; Pullman, WA	W 29–24	20,122	
November 13	at California	California Memorial Stadium; Berkeley, CA	L 22–23	30,000	
November 20	Washington	Joe Albi Stadium; Spokane, WA (Apple Cup)	L 32–51	35,800	
*Non-conference game; ^{†}Homecoming; Rankings from AP Poll released prior to the game

== Game summaries ==
=== USC ===
#11 USC Trojans (3–1) at Washington State Cougars (1–3)

Quarter	1	2	3	4	Total
USC	0	14	0	9	23
Washington State	0	7	0	7	14

at Kingdome, Seattle, Washington

- Date: October 9
- Game weather: Indoors (dome)
- Game attendance: 37,268

Game information

First quarter

- No scoring

Second quarter

- USC – Ricky Bell 1-yard run (Glen Walker kick). USC 7–0. Drive:
- USC – Shelton Diggs 55-yard pass from Vince Evans (Glen Walker kick, 6:23. USC 14–0. Drive:
- WSU – Harold Gillum 4-yard run (Chuck Diedrick kick). USC 14–7. Drive:

Third quarter

- No scoring

Fourth quarter

- WSU – Brian Kelly 23-yard pass from Jack Thompson (Chuck Diedrick kick). Tie 14–14. Drive:
- USC – Glen Walker 26-yard field goal, 9:26. USC 17–14. Drive:
- USC – Ricky Bell 9-yard run (kick failed). USC 23–14. Drive:

Top passers

- USC
- WSU – Jack Thompson – 26/48, 341 yards, TD

Top rushers

- USC – Ricky Bell – 51 rushes, 346 yards, 2 TD
- WSU

Top receivers

- USC
- WSU

"1976 Washington State vs. USC (game film, silent)" on YouTube

== Roster ==
1976 Washington State Cougars football team roster
Players
Coaches
Offense

Pos.	#	Name	Class
QB	12	Wally Bennett	Sr
WR	13	Bob Bratkowski	Jr
TE	88	Ron Bull	So
RB		Sam Busch
C	60	Jon DesPois	Sr
RB		Mike Doerfler
RB	11	Dan Doornink	Jr
RB		Tali Ena
G	71	Larry Finan	Jr
RB	25	Harold Gillum	So
OT	54	Bob Hill	Sr
QB	18	John Hopkins	Sr
WR	44	Brian Kelly	Jr
OL		Allan Kennedy
G	65	Tom Larsen	Jr
OT	68	Dave Lemke	Jr
WR	21	Mike Levenseller	Jr
WR		Bevan Maxey
TE	83	Eason Ramson	Jr
QB	14	Jack Thompson	So
RB		Toby Tisby
RB	26	Mike Washington	Fr
RB	31	Ray Williams	Fr

Defense

Pos.	#	Name	Class
LB	96	Raleigh Fletcher	So
LB	98	Terry Gilmore	So
CB	37	Ken Greene	Jr
DB		Bob Gregor
DT	76	Spud Harris	Fr
DL		Mark Hicks
LB	57	Don Hover	Jr
LB	97	Jeff Jones	So
DT	87	Tim Ochs	Sr
CB	15	Mark Patterson	Jr
LB		Dean Pedigo
DE	38	Mel Sanders	Fr
DB	48	Don Schwartz	Jr
DE	36	Tom Thompson	So
S	16	John Troppman	Jr
NG	50	George Yarno	So

Special teams

Pos.	#	Name	Class
K	33	Chuck Diedrick	Jr
P	46	Gavin Hedrick	Jr

Head coach

- Jackie Sherrill (1st year)

Coordinators/assistant coaches

- Dave Campo (DB)
- Bill Cords
- Michael Church (DL)
- Rod Kirby (LB)
- Bob Leahy (OC)
- Howard Tippett (DC)
- Mike Price (RB)
- Dave Walker (OL)

Legend

- (C) Team captain
- (S) Suspended
- (I) Ineligible
- Injured
- Redshirt
