= 1976 Colorado State Rams football team =

American college football season

1976 Colorado State Rams football
- Conference: Western Athletic Conference
- Record: 6–5 (2–4 WAC)
- Head coach: Sark Arslanian (4th season)
- Home stadium: Hughes Stadium

1976 Western Athletic Conference football standings
	Conf.					Overall
Team	W		L		T	W		L		T
BYU +	6	–	1	–	0	9	–	3	–	0
Wyoming +	6	–	1	–	0	8	–	4	–	0
Arizona State	4	–	3	–	0	4	–	7	–	0
Utah	3	–	3	–	0	3	–	8	–	0
Arizona	3	–	4	–	0	5	–	6	–	0
New Mexico	3	–	4	–	0	4	–	7	–	0
Colorado State	2	–	4	–	0	6	–	5	–	0
UTEP	0	–	7	–	0	1	–	11	–	0
+ – Conference co-champions

The 1976 Colorado State Rams football team was an American football team that represented Colorado State University in the Western Athletic Conference (WAC) during the 1976 NCAA Division I football season. In its fourth season under head coach Sark Arslanian, the team compiled a 6–5 record (2–4 against WAC opponents). Colorado State's junior quarterback, Dan Graham, passed for 816 yards, 2 touchdown's and 5 interceptions.

== Schedule ==
Date	Opponent	Site	Result	Attendance	Source
September 11	at Oregon*	Autzen Stadium; Eugene, OR	L 3–17	37,800	
September 18	at BYU	Cougar Stadium; Provo, UT	L 18–42	33,013	
September 25	Wichita State*	Hughes Stadium; Fort Collins, CO	W 24–3	24,680	
October 2	New Mexico	Hughes Stadium; Fort Collins, CO	L 20–33	21,719	
October 9	at Utah State*	Romney Stadium; Logan, UT	W 10–7	7,868	
October 16	at Air Force*	Falcon Stadium; Colorado Springs, CO (rivalry)	W 27–3	25,363	
October 23	UTEP	Hughes Stadium; Fort Collins, CO	W 47–10	18,652	
October 30	Wyoming^{†}	Hughes Stadium; Fort Collins, CO (rivalry)	W 19–16	32,572	
November 6	Idaho*	Hughes Stadium; Fort Collins, CO	W 31–14	17,536	
November 13	at Arizona	Arizona Stadium; Tucson, AZ	L 6–23	44,716	
November 20	at Arizona State	Sun Devil Stadium; Tempe, AZ	L 19–21	48,294	
*Non-conference game; ^{†}Homecoming

== Roster ==
1976 Colorado State Rams football team roster
Players
Coaches
Offense

Pos.	#	Name	Class
WR	11	Mark Bell	So
TE	88	Mark Bell	So
TE	83	Rick Dennison	Fr
QB	7	Dan Graham	Jr
RB	25	Ben Norman	Jr
WR	20	Harry Washington	Jr

Defense

Pos.	#	Name	Class
DE	99	Al Baker	Jr
DE	76	Mike Bell	So
DB	31	Keith King	Sr
LB	90	Mark Nichols	Jr

Special teams

Pos.	#	Name	Class

Head coach

- Sark Arslanian

Coordinators/assistant coaches

Legend

- (C) Team captain
- (S) Suspended
- (I) Ineligible
- Injured
- Redshirt

== Team players in the NFL ==
Player	Position	Round	Pick	NFL club
Keith King	Defensive Back	3	77	San Diego Chargers
