= 1976 California Golden Bears football team =

American college football season

1976 California Golden Bears football
- Conference: Pacific-8 Conference
- Record: 5–6 (3–4 Pac-8)
- Head coach: Mike White (5th season)
- Home stadium: California Memorial Stadium

1976 Pacific-8 Conference football standings
	Conf.					Overall
Team	W		L		T	W		L		T
No. 2 USC $	7	–	0	–	0	11	–	1	–	0
No. 15 UCLA	6	–	1	–	0	9	–	2	–	1
Stanford	5	–	2	–	0	6	–	5	–	0
California	3	–	4	–	0	5	–	6	–	0
Washington	3	–	4	–	0	5	–	6	–	0
Washington State	2	–	5	–	0	3	–	8	–	0
Oregon	1	–	6	–	0	4	–	7	–	0
Oregon State	1	–	6	–	0	2	–	10	–	0
$ – Conference champion; Rankings from AP Poll

The 1976 California Golden Bears football team was an American football team that represented the University of California, Berkeley in the Pacific-8 Conference during the 1976 NCAA Division I football season. Under fifth-year head coach Mike White, the Golden Bears compiled an overall record of 5–6 and 3–4 in conference.

The leader of the previous season's team was quarterback Joe Roth, a junior college transfer, who was a Heisman Trophy candidate as a senior in 1976. Roth had a great start, however halfway through it his performance started to drop. Unknown to almost everyone, he was diagnosed with melanoma the most dangerous form of skin cancer; only head coach White and his closest friends knew about it. With Roth continuing to play, he still had a strong season and was named an All-American. His last game was in January 1977 at an all-star game in Japan and he died several weeks later in Berkeley. His former locker is dedicated in his honor and the annual home game against UCLA or USC is known as the Joe Roth game.

== Schedule ==
Date	Opponent	Rank	Site	Result	Attendance	Source
September 11	at No. 16 Georgia*	No. 15	Sanford Stadium; Athens, GA	L 24–36	47,000	
September 18	at No. 4 Oklahoma*		Oklahoma Memorial Stadium; Norman, OK	L 17–28	71,286	
September 25	at Arizona State*		Sun Devil Stadium; Tempe, AZ	W 31–22	50,876	
October 2	San Jose State*		California Memorial Stadium; Berkeley, CA	W 43–16	42,120	
October 9	Oregon		California Memorial Stadium; Berkeley, CA	W 27–10	37,950	
October 16	at Oregon State		Parker Stadium; Corvallis, OR	L 9–10	23,963	
October 23	No. 4 UCLA		California Memorial Stadium; Berkeley, CA (rivalry)	L 19–35	62,228	
October 30	at No. 4 USC		Los Angeles Memorial Coliseum; Los Angeles, CA	L 6–20	60,323	
November 6	at Washington		Husky Stadium; Seattle, WA	W 7–0	39,086	
November 13	Washington State		California Memorial Stadium; Berkeley, CA	W 23–22	30,000	
November 20	Stanford		California Memorial Stadium; Berkeley, CA (Big Game)	L 24–27	76,780	
*Non-conference game; Rankings from AP Poll released prior to the game

== Roster ==
- OT Ted Albrecht
- LB Jeff Barnes
- QB Fred Besana
- PK Jim Breech
- TE George Freitas
- DB Anthony Green
- LB Phil Heck
- DB Ken McAllister
- OG Greg Peters
- LB James Reed
- QB Joe Roth
- LB Burl Toler
- WR Wesley Walker

== Draft picks ==
Six Golden Bears were selected in the 1977 NFL draft.

Player	Position	Round	Pick	NFL club
Ted Albrecht	Offensive tackle	1	15	Chicago Bears
Wesley Walker	Wide receiver	2	33	New York Jets
Fred Besana	Quarterback	5	115	Buffalo Bills
Jeff Barnes	Linebacker	5	139	Oakland Raiders
Phil Heck	Linebacker	11	297	Denver Broncos
Greg Peters	Offensive guard	12	332	Dallas Cowboys
