= 1977 Rose Bowl =

American college football game

- 63rd Rose Bowl Game
Michigan Wolverines	USC Trojans
(10–1)	(10–1)
Big Ten	Pac-8
6	14
Head coach: Bo Schembechler	Head coach: John Robinson
AP / Coaches; 2 / 2	AP / Coaches; 3 / 3
	1	2	3	4	Total
Michigan	0	6	0	0	6
USC	0	7	0	7	14
- Date: January 1, 1977
- Season: 1976
- Stadium: Rose Bowl
- Location: Pasadena, California
- MVP: Vince Evans (USC QB)
- Favorite: Michigan by 4 to 6 points
- Referee: James Mercer (Pac-8); (split crew: Pac-8, Big Ten)
- Attendance: 106,182

United States TV coverage
- Network: NBC
- Announcers: Curt Gowdy, Don Meredith
- Nielsen ratings: 26.9

The 1977 Rose Bowl was a college football bowl game played on January 1, 1977. It was the 63rd Rose Bowl Game. The USC Trojans, champions of the Pacific-8 Conference, defeated the Michigan Wolverines, champions of the Big Ten Conference, 14–6.

USC quarterback Vince Evans was named the Rose Bowl Player of the Game, and Trojan freshman tailback Charles White, subbing for Heisman Trophy runner-up Ricky Bell, who was injured in the first quarter, rushed for 114 yards and a touchdown. It was the third consecutive win for the Pac-8 in the Rose Bowl, and the seventh of the last eight.

== Teams ==
=== Michigan ===
Michigan won their first eight games and spent most of the season ranked first in the polls, until a 16–14 upset loss to Purdue on November 6. They capped off their Big Ten championship with a 22–0 shutout of arch rival Ohio State; they were ranked second in both major polls at the end of the regular season.

=== USC ===
Under first-year head coach John Robinson, USC was upset in the season opener at home by Missouri, 46–25. It was the Trojans' fifth-straight regular season loss, dating back to the prior season when John McKay had announced his end-of-season resignation (leaving for the expansion Tampa Bay Buccaneers of the NFL). USC won the rest of their games in 1976, climaxed by a 24–14 win over #2 UCLA to clinch the conference championship, and a subsequent 17–13 victory over Notre Dame.

== Scoring ==
=== First quarter ===
- No scoring

=== Second quarter ===
- Michigan - Rob Lytle, 1-yard run (Bob Wood kick blocked)
- USC - Vince Evans, 1-yard run (Walker kick)

=== Third quarter ===
- No scoring

=== Fourth quarter ===
- USC - Charles White, 7-yard run (Walker kick)

== Aftermath ==
Undefeated Pittsburgh, led by Heisman Trophy winner Tony Dorsett, was the consensus #1 team entering the bowls and played #4 Georgia in the Sugar Bowl in New Orleans. USC and Michigan hoped Georgia would upset Pitt to set up the Rose Bowl as a national championship showdown, but Pitt had a dominant 27–3 win earlier in the day to keep its top ranking in the final polls; USC finished second and Michigan dropped only to third.
