= 1976 Arizona State Sun Devils football team =

American college football season

1976 Arizona State Sun Devils football
- Conference: Western Athletic Conference
- Record: 4–7 (4–3 WAC)
- Head coach: Frank Kush (19th season)
- Defensive coordinator: Larry Kentera (6th season)
- Home stadium: Sun Devil Stadium

1976 Western Athletic Conference football standings
	Conf.					Overall
Team	W		L		T	W		L		T
BYU +	6	–	1	–	0	9	–	3	–	0
Wyoming +	6	–	1	–	0	8	–	4	–	0
Arizona State	4	–	3	–	0	4	–	7	–	0
Utah	3	–	3	–	0	3	–	8	–	0
Arizona	3	–	4	–	0	5	–	6	–	0
New Mexico	3	–	4	–	0	4	–	7	–	0
Colorado State	2	–	4	–	0	6	–	5	–	0
UTEP	0	–	7	–	0	1	–	11	–	0
+ – Conference co-champions

The 1976 Arizona State Sun Devils football team was an American football team that represented Arizona State University in the Western Athletic Conference (WAC) during the 1976 NCAA Division I football season. In their 19th season under head coach Frank Kush, the Sun Devils compiled a 4–7 record (4–3 against WAC opponents), finished in third place in the WAC, and were outscored by their opponents by a combined total of 241 to 223.

The team's statistical leaders included Dennis Sproul with 1,751 passing yards, Freddie Williams with 516 rushing yards, and Larry Mucker with 835 receiving yards.

== Schedule ==
Date	Opponent	Rank	Site	Result	Attendance	Source
September 9	No. 17 UCLA*	No. 3	Sun Devil Stadium; Tempe, AZ	L 10–28	50,876	
September 25	California*		Sun Devil Stadium; Tempe, AZ	L 22–31	50,876	
October 2	at Wyoming		War Memorial Stadium; Laramie, WY	L 10–13	25,406	
October 9	Cincinnati*		Sun Devil Stadium; Tempe, AZ	L 0–14	47,297	
October 16	at UTEP		Sun Bowl; El Paso, TX	W 23–6	15,500	
October 23	New Mexico		Sun Devil Stadium; Tempe, AZ	W 31–15	48,547	
October 30	at BYU		Cougar Stadium; Provo, UT	L 21–43	29,854	
November 6	Air Force*		Sun Devil Stadium; Tempe, AZ	L 30–31	46,733	
November 13	Utah		Sun Devil Stadium; Tempe, AZ	L 28–31	40,076	
November 20	Colorado State		Sun Devil Stadium; Tempe, AZ	W 21–19	48,294	
November 27	at Arizona		Arizona Stadium; Tucson, AZ (Territorial Cup)	W 27–10	56,800	
*Non-conference game; Rankings from Coaches' Poll released prior to the game

== Personnel ==
1976 Arizona State Sun Devils football team roster
Players
Coaches
Offense

Pos.	#	Name	Class
QB	10	Dennis Sproul	Jr
RB	36	Fred Williams	Sr
WR		John Jefferson	Jr
WR		Chris DeFrance	So
TE		Bruce Hardy	Jr

Defense

Pos.	#	Name	Class
DE		Al Harris	So
S		John Harris	Jr
S		Kim Anderson	So

Special teams

Pos.	#	Name	Class

Head coach

- Frank Kush

Coordinators/assistant coaches

Legend

- (C) Team captain
- (S) Suspended
- (I) Ineligible
- Injured
- Redshirt
