= 1976 Tangerine Bowl =

American college football game

BYU Cougars	Oklahoma State Cowboys
(9–2)	(8–3)
WAC	Big Eight
21	49
Head coach: Lavell Edwards	Head coach: Jim Stanley
AP / Coaches; NR / 17	AP / Coaches; 14 / 14
	1	2	3	4	Total
BYU	0	14	7	0	21
Oklahoma State	7	21	21	0	49
- Date: December 18, 1976
- Season: 1976
- Stadium: Tangerine Bowl
- Location: Orlando, Florida
- MVP: Terry Miller, Oklahoma State (offensive & overall); Phillip Dokes, Oklahoma State (defensive)
- Attendance: 37,812

The 1976 Tangerine Bowl was held on December 18, 1976, featuring the BYU Cougars and Oklahoma State Cowboys at the Tangerine Bowl stadium in Orlando, Florida. BYU represented the Western Athletic Conference (WAC) in only their second bowl game as a program, and Oklahoma State represented the Big Eight Conference. The matchup pitted the two schools in the postseason for the second time in three years, following the 1974 Fiesta Bowl, a game in which the Cowboys defeated the Cougars by a score of 16–6. Oklahoma State's running back Terry Miller broke the Tangerine Bowl records for total net yards run and longest run from scrimmage as well as tying another with four touchdowns scored as OSU defeated BYU, 49–21.

It was during this game, as well a regular season matchup between Florida and Miami three weeks earlier, that the new east upper deck at the stadium severely swayed whenever fans stood up and cheered. The poorly designed upper deck became a huge source of controversy, and was dismantled just over three years later.

== Background ==
BYU was champion of the WAC for the third time in 11 years. The Cowboys went 3–1 against ranked opponents (beating #8 Kansas, #5 Oklahoma, and #14 Iowa State while losing to #9 Nebraska) while finishing in a three-way tie (the first and only time this occurred in conference history) in the Big Eight with Oklahoma and Colorado, with the former going to the Fiesta Bowl and the latter (who beat Oklahoma State) going to the Orange Bowl. The Cowboys were invited to the Tangerine Bowl, their second bowl appearance in three seasons. The two teams had met previously in the 1974 Fiesta Bowl.

== Game summary ==
- Oklahoma State – Dawson 36 pass interception (Daigle kick)
- BYU – Christensen 1-yard run (Taylor kick)
- Oklahoma State – Weatherbie 2-yard run (Daigle kick)
- Oklahoma State – Miller 3-yard run (Daigle kick)
- BYU – Thompson 27-yard pass from Nielson (Taylor kick)
- Oklahoma State – Miller 78-yard run (Daigle kick)
- BYU – Lowry 102-yard kickoff return (Taylor kick)
- Oklahoma State – R. Turner 1-yard run (kick failed)
- Oklahoma State – Miller 6-yard run (Lisle pass from Weatherbie)
- Oklahoma State – Miller 1-yard run (Daigle kick)

Terry Miller rushed for 173 yards on 23 carries for the Cowboys, who scored 21 straight points in the third quarter to pull away from the Cougars.

== Aftermath ==
The Cougars returned to this bowl nine years later, by which time the game's name had changed and it was the 1985 Florida Citrus Bowl, while the Cowboys have not returned to this bowl.
