= 1976 Wyoming Cowboys football team =

American college football season

1976 Wyoming Cowboys football

WAC co-champion

Fiesta Bowl, L 7–41 vs. Oklahoma
- Conference: Western Athletic Conference
- Record: 8–4 (6–1 WAC)
- Head coach: Fred Akers (2nd season)
- Defensive coordinator: Leon Fuller (2nd season)
- Captains: Ray Davies; Steve Edwards; Kevin McClain; Paul Nunu
- Home stadium: War Memorial Stadium

1976 Western Athletic Conference football standings
	Conf.					Overall
Team	W		L		T	W		L		T
BYU +	6	–	1	–	0	9	–	3	–	0
Wyoming +	6	–	1	–	0	8	–	4	–	0
Arizona State	4	–	3	–	0	4	–	7	–	0
Utah	3	–	3	–	0	3	–	8	–	0
Arizona	3	–	4	–	0	5	–	6	–	0
New Mexico	3	–	4	–	0	4	–	7	–	0
Colorado State	2	–	4	–	0	6	–	5	–	0
UTEP	0	–	7	–	0	1	–	11	–	0
+ – Conference co-champions

The 1976 Wyoming Cowboys football team was an American football team that represented the University of Wyoming as a member of the Western Athletic Conference (WAC) during the 1976 NCAA Division I football season. In their second and final season under head coach Fred Akers, the Cowboys compiled an 8–4 record (6–1 against conference opponents), tied for the WAC championship, lost to Oklahoma in the Fiesta Bowl, and outscored their opponents by a total of 278 to 250.

They played their home games on campus at War Memorial Stadium in Laramie, Wyoming.

The team's statistical leaders included Don Clayton with 409 passing yards, Robbie Wright with 718 rushing yards, Walter Howard with 305 receiving yards, and Dan Christopulos with 53 points scored.

It was Wyoming's first winning season since 1969 and first bowl appearance since the Sugar Bowl in January 1968. Akers soon departed for the University of Texas and the Cowboys' next winning season was in 1980; the next bowl appearance was in December 1987.

== Schedule ==
Date	Opponent	Site	Result	Attendance	Source
September 11	South Dakota*	War Memorial Stadium; Laramie, WY	W 48–7	20,373	
September 18	at Michigan State*	Spartan Stadium; East Lansing, MI	L 10–21	57,183	
September 25	Utah State*	War Memorial Stadium; Laramie, WY	W 20–3	19,574	
October 2	Arizona State	War Memorial Stadium; Laramie, WY	W 13–10	25,406	
October 9	at BYU	Cougar Stadium; Provo, UT	W 34–29	35,423	
October 16	New Mexico	War Memorial Stadium; Laramie, WY	W 24–23	23,649	
October 23	Utah	War Memorial Stadium; Laramie, WY	W 45–22	20,609	
October 30	at Colorado State	Hughes Stadium; Fort Collins, CO	L 16–19	32,572	
November 6	at Arizona	Arizona Stadium; Tucson, AZ	W 26–24	52,809	
November 13	at UTEP	Sun Bowl; El Paso, TX	W 14–10	4,200	
November 20	at Air Force*	Falcon Stadium; Colorado Springs, CO	L 21–41	25,736	
December 25	vs. No. 8 Oklahoma*	Sun Devil Stadium; Tempe, AZ (Fiesta Bowl)	L 7–41	48,714	
*Non-conference game; Rankings from AP Poll released prior to the game
