= 1976 Stanford Cardinals football team =

American college football season

1976 Stanford Cardinals football
- Conference: Pacific-8 Conference
- Record: 6–5 (5–2 Pac-8)
- Head coach: Jack Christiansen (5th season)
- Defensive coordinator: Norb Hecker (5th season)
- Home stadium: Stanford Stadium

1976 Pacific-8 Conference football standings
	Conf.					Overall
Team	W		L		T	W		L		T
No. 2 USC $	7	–	0	–	0	11	–	1	–	0
No. 15 UCLA	6	–	1	–	0	9	–	2	–	1
Stanford	5	–	2	–	0	6	–	5	–	0
California	3	–	4	–	0	5	–	6	–	0
Washington	3	–	4	–	0	5	–	6	–	0
Washington State	2	–	5	–	0	3	–	8	–	0
Oregon	1	–	6	–	0	4	–	7	–	0
Oregon State	1	–	6	–	0	2	–	10	–	0
$ – Conference champion; Rankings from AP Poll

The 1976 Stanford Cardinals football team represented Stanford University in the Pacific-8 Conference during the 1976 NCAA Division I football season. Led by fifth-year head coach Jack Christiansen, the Cardinals were 6–5 overall (5–2 in Pac-8, third) and played home games on campus at Stanford Stadium in Stanford, California

After a disappointing season that started at 1–4, Christiansen was fired the day before the last game of the season, the Big Game at Cal; he coached that final game, which Stanford rallied to win in the final two minutes.

With two seasons remaining on a five-year contract (at $27,500 annually), Christiansen did not have a losing season at Stanford, was 30–22–3 (.573) overall, and 22–12–1 (.643) in conference. The Cardinals had five Pac-8 wins in each of his last four seasons, finishing no lower than third.

Bill Walsh, the offensive coordinator of the NFL's San Diego Chargers, was hired as head coach in December, and led Stanford for the next two seasons, both ending with bowl wins.

== Schedule ==
Date	Opponent	Site	Result	Attendance	Source
September 11	at No. 10 Penn State*	Beaver Stadium; University Park, PA	L 12–15	61,645	
September 18	at No. 1 Michigan*	Michigan Stadium; Ann Arbor, MI	L 0–51	103,741	
September 25	San Jose State*	Stanford Stadium; Stanford, CA (rivalry)	W 28–23	51,000	
October 2	at Army*	Michie Stadium; West Point, NY	L 20–21	30,382	
October 9	at No. 5 UCLA	Los Angeles Memorial Coliseum; Los Angeles, CA	L 20–38	50,894	
October 16	Washington	Stanford Stadium; Stanford, CA	W 34–28	36,000	
October 23	at Washington State	Martin Stadium; Pullman, WA	W 22–16	24,300	
October 30	Oregon State	Stanford Stadium; Stanford, CA	W 24–3	30,500	
November 6	No. 4 USC	Stanford Stadium; Stanford, CA (rivalry)	L 24–48	76,500	
November 13	at Oregon	Autzen Stadium; Eugene, OR	W 28–17	18,000	
November 20	at California	California Memorial Stadium; Berkeley, CA (Big Game)	W 27–24	76,780	
*Non-conference game; Rankings from AP Poll released prior to the game

== Roster ==
- OT Gary Anderson
- QB Guy Benjamin
- LB Gordy Ceresino
- QB Mike Cordova
- QB Steve Dils
- WR James Lofton
- WR Tony Hill
- DE Duncan McColl
- PK Mike Michel
- QB Turk Schonert

== NFL draft ==
Five Cardinals were selected in the 1977 NFL draft.

Player	Position	Round	Overall	Franchise
Tony Hill	WR	3	62	Dallas Cowboys
Duncan McColl	DE	4	97	Washington Redskins
Mike Michel	K	5	113	Miami Dolphins
Gary Anderson	OL	10	263	Detroit Lions
Mike Cordova	QB	11	286	Philadelphia Eagles
