= 1976 Oregon State Beavers football team =

American college football season

1976 Oregon State Beavers football
- Conference: Pacific-8 Conference
- Record: 2–10 (1–6 Pac-8)
- Head coach: Craig Fertig (1st season)
- Offensive coordinator: Tony Kopay (1st season)
- Defensive coordinator: Ray Braun (1st season)
- Home stadium: Parker Stadium

1976 Pacific-8 Conference football standings
	Conf.					Overall
Team	W		L		T	W		L		T
No. 2 USC $	7	–	0	–	0	11	–	1	–	0
No. 15 UCLA	6	–	1	–	0	9	–	2	–	1
Stanford	5	–	2	–	0	6	–	5	–	0
California	3	–	4	–	0	5	–	6	–	0
Washington	3	–	4	–	0	5	–	6	–	0
Washington State	2	–	5	–	0	3	–	8	–	0
Oregon	1	–	6	–	0	4	–	7	–	0
Oregon State	1	–	6	–	0	2	–	10	–	0
$ – Conference champion; Rankings from AP Poll

The 1976 Oregon State Beavers football team represented Oregon State University as a member of the Pacific-8 Conference (Pac-8) during the 1976 NCAA Division I football season. In their first season under head coach Craig Fertig, the Beavers compiled an overall record of 2–10 with a mark of 1–6 in conference play, placing last out of eight teams in the Pac-8, and were outscored 325 to 179. The team played its five home games on campus at Parker Stadium in Corvallis.

Fertig, age 34, was previously an assistant coach as the University of Southern California (USC) and a quarterback for the USC Trojans under John McKay. He succeeded Dee Andros in December 1975 with a three-year contract at $26,000 per year.

== Schedule ==
Date	Opponent	Site	Result	Attendance	Source
September 4	No. 19 Kansas*	Parker Stadium; Corvallis, OR	L 16–28	29,952	
September 11	at Kentucky*	Commonwealth Stadium; Lexington, KY	L 13–38	56,723	
September 18	at No. 16 LSU*	Tiger Stadium; Baton Rouge, LA	L 11–28	68,057	
October 2	at Syracuse*	Archbold Stadium; Syracuse, NY	L 3–21	18,591	
October 9	Washington	Parker Stadium; Corvallis, OR	L 12–24	27,096	
October 16	California	Parker Stadium; Corvallis, OR	W 10–9	23,963	
October 23	at No. 7 USC	Los Angeles Memorial Coliseum; Los Angeles, CA	L 0–56	53,216	
October 30	at Stanford	Stanford Stadium; Stanford, CA	L 3–24	30,500	
November 6	at Washington State	Martin Stadium; Pullman, WA	L 24–29	20,122	
November 13	No. 2 UCLA	Parker Stadium; Corvallis, OR	L 14–45	22,151	
November 20	Oregon	Parker Stadium; Corvallis, OR (Civil War)	L 14–23	35,611	
November 27	at Hawaii*	Aloha Stadium; Halawa, HI	W 59–0	4,900	
*Non-conference game; Rankings from AP Poll released prior to the game

== Roster ==
1976 Oregon State Beavers football team roster
Players
Coaches
Offense

Pos.	#	Name	Class
FB		Byron Kellar
RB		Jarvis Redwine	Fr
QB		Scott Richardson	Fr

Defense

Pos.	#	Name	Class

Special teams

Pos.	#	Name	Class

Head coach

- Craig Fertig (1st year)

Coordinators/assistant coaches

- Tony Kopay (OC)
- Ray Braun (DC)
- Nate Shaw (DB)

Legend

- (C) Team captain
- (S) Suspended
- (I) Ineligible
- Injured
- Redshirt
