= 1976 Washington Huskies football team =

American college football season

1976 Washington Huskies football
- Conference: Pacific-8 Conference
- Record: 5–6 (3–4 Pac-8)
- Head coach: Don James (2nd season)
- Offensive coordinator: Dick Scesniak (2nd season)
- Defensive coordinator: Jim E. Mora (2nd season)
- MVP: Robin Earl
- Captains: Robin Earl; Scott Phillips; Charles Jackson; Mike Baldassin
- Home stadium: Husky Stadium

1976 Pacific-8 Conference football standings
	Conf.					Overall
Team	W		L		T	W		L		T
No. 2 USC $	7	–	0	–	0	11	–	1	–	0
No. 15 UCLA	6	–	1	–	0	9	–	2	–	1
Stanford	5	–	2	–	0	6	–	5	–	0
California	3	–	4	–	0	5	–	6	–	0
Washington	3	–	4	–	0	5	–	6	–	0
Washington State	2	–	5	–	0	3	–	8	–	0
Oregon	1	–	6	–	0	4	–	7	–	0
Oregon State	1	–	6	–	0	2	–	10	–	0
$ – Conference champion; Rankings from AP Poll

The 1976 Washington Huskies football team represented the University of Washington in the 1976 NCAA Division I football season as a member of the Pacific-8 Conference (Pac-8). The Huskies were led by head coach Don James in his second year, and played their home games on campus at Husky Stadium in Seattle. They finished season with a record of five wins and six losses (5–6 overall, 3–4 in the Pac-8). This was Washington's last losing season for 28 years, until 2004.

The Huskies defeated rivals Oregon and Washington State for a third consecutive year.

== Schedule ==
Date	Opponent	Site	TV	Result	Attendance	Source
September 11	Virginia*	Husky Stadium; Seattle, WA		W 38–17	37,500–40,412	
September 18	Colorado*	Husky Stadium; Seattle, WA	ABC	L 7–21	36,600	
September 25	Indiana*	Husky Stadium; Seattle, WA		L 13–20	40,425–42,206	
October 2	Minnesota*	Husky Stadium; Seattle, WA		W 38–7	37,994	
October 9	at Oregon State	Parker Stadium; Corvallis, OR		W 24–12	27,096	
October 16	at Stanford	Stanford Stadium; Stanford, CA		L 28–34	36,000	
October 23	Oregon	Husky Stadium; Seattle, WA (rivalry)		W 14–7	38,127	
October 30	No. 3 UCLA	Husky Stadium; Seattle, WA		L 21–30	47,719	
November 6	California	Husky Stadium; Seattle, WA		L 0–7	39,086	
November 13	at No. 3 USC	Los Angeles Memorial Coliseum; Los Angeles, CA		L 3–20	49,264	
November 20	vs. Washington State	Joe Albi Stadium; Spokane, WA (Apple Cup)		W 51–32	35,800	
*Non-conference game; Rankings from AP Poll released prior to the game

== Game summaries ==
=== Oregon State ===
Washington Huskies at Oregon State Beavers

Quarter	1	2	3	4	Total
Washington	0	24	0	0	24
Oregon St	0	0	0	12	12

at Parker Stadium • Corvallis, Oregon

- Date: October 9
- Game attendance: 27,096

Game information

Washington

- Moon
  9/15, 88 yds, 2 int
- Steele
  17 rush, 78 yds, 2 TD
- Phillips
  5 rec, 40 yds

Oregon St

- Richardson
  5/14, 46 yds, int
- Redwine
  18 rush, 70 yds
- Hammock
  6 rec, 62 yds, TD

Scoring summary

Quarter	Time	Drive			Team	Scoring information	Score	
Quarter	Time	Plays	Yards	TOP	Team	Scoring information	UW	OSU
2	14:19	6	37		Washington	36-yard field goal by Robbins	3	0
2	10:02				Washington	Brooks 20-yard blocked punt return for touchdown, Robbins kick good	10	0
2	3:49	9	57		Washington	Steele 1-yard touchdown run, Robbins kick good	0	17
2	1:04	5	25		Washington	Steele 3-yard touchdown run, Robbins kick good	24	0
4	9:59	2	7		Oregon St	Hammock 6-yard touchdown reception from Grossart, 2-point run failed	24	6
4	0:19	3	10		Oregon St	Fields 3-yard touchdown run, 2-point run failed	24	12
"TOP" = time of possession. For other American football terms, see Glossary of American football.							24	12

== Roster ==
1976 Washington Huskies football team roster
Players
Coaches
Offense

Pos.	#	Name	Class
QB	1	Warren Moon	Jr
WR	6	Leon Garrett	Sr
QB	12	Tom Flick	Fr
QB	16	Cliff McBride
RB	24	Joe Steele	Fr
RB	26	Ron Rowland	Jr
RB	32	Greg Martin	So
FB	42	Ron Gipson	Fr
C	58	Blair Bush	Jr
G	62	Phil Foreman	Fr
G	63	Jeff Toews	So
G	68	Dan Chavira	Fr
OT	70	Roger Westlund	So
OT	79	Carl Van Valkenberg	Sr
TE	86	Scott Greenwood	So
WR	91	Scott Phillips (C)	Jr
WR	93	Spider Gaines	So
TE	95	Don Wardlow	Sr
FB, TE	99	Robin Earl (C)	Sr

Defense

Pos.	#	Name	Class
LB	5	Michael Jackson	So
CB	10	Lance Theoudele	Fr
CB	19	Mark Lee	Fr
CB	23	Nesby Glasgow	So
DB	46	Greg Grimes	Fr
LB	48	Antowaine Richardson	Fr
LB	53	Rob Gehring	Sr
LB	60	Mike Baldassin (C)	Sr
DT	61	Chris Linnin	Fr
DT	65	Dave Browning	So
NG	66	Charles Jackson (C)	Sr
DE	73	Doug Martin	Fr
LB	82	Bret Gagliardi	Fr
FS	96	Kyle Heinrich	So

Special teams

Pos.	#	Name	Class
P	3	Don Feleay	Sr
PK	7	Steve Robbins	Jr

Head coach

- Don James (2nd year)

Coordinators/assistant coaches

- Dick Scesniak (OC)
- Jim Mora (DC)
- Jim Lambright (LB)

Legend

- (C) Team captain
- (S) Suspended
- (I) Ineligible
- Injured
- Redshirt

== NFL draft selections ==
Three Washington Huskies were selected in the 1977 NFL draft, which lasted 12 rounds with 335 selections.

= Husky Hall of Fame

Player	Position	Round	Overall	Franchise
Robin Earl	Running back	3rd	61	Chicago Bears
Charles Jackson	Defensive tackle	9th	241	Denver Broncos
Don Wardlow	Tight end	11th	305	Dallas Cowboys
