= 1976 Fiesta Bowl =

American college football game

- 6th Fiesta Bowl
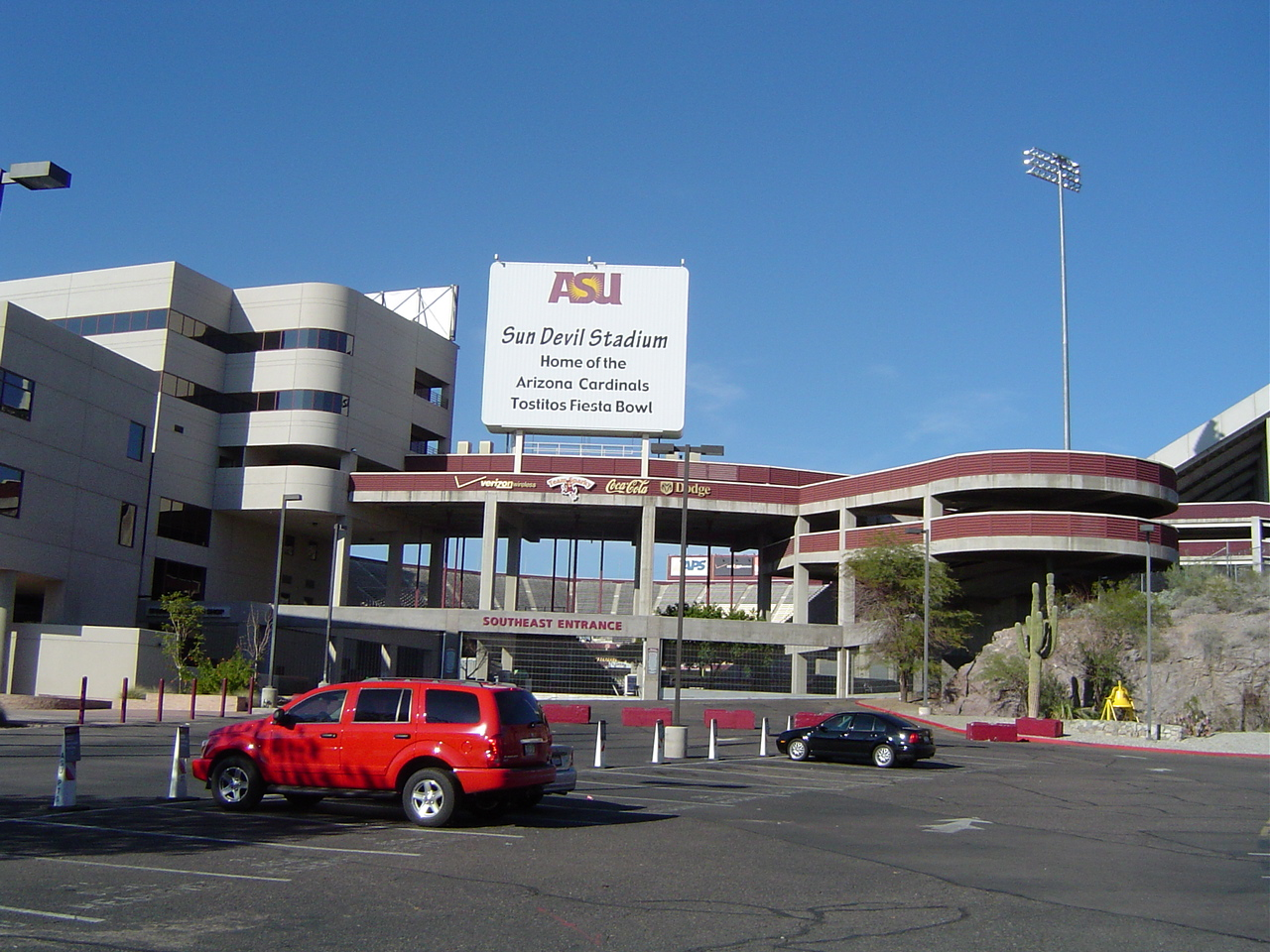
- Sun Devil Stadium in Tempe, Arizona, hosted the Fiesta Bowl.
Oklahoma Sooners	Wyoming Cowboys
(8–2–1)	(8–3)
Big 8	WAC
41	7
Head coach: Barry Switzer	Head coach: Fred Akers
AP / Coaches; 8 / 9	AP / Coaches; NR / NR
	1	2	3	4	Total
Oklahoma	14	6	7	14	41
Wyoming	0	0	0	7	7
- Date: December 25, 1976
- Season: 1976
- Stadium: Sun Devil Stadium
- Location: Tempe, Arizona
- MVP: Thomas Lott (Oklahoma QB); Terry Peters (Oklahoma CB)
- Favorite: Oklahoma by 21 points
- Attendance: 48,714

United States TV coverage
- Network: CBS
- Announcers: Lindsey Nelson and Paul Hornung

The 1976 Fiesta Bowl was the sixth edition of the college football bowl game, played at Sun Devil Stadium in Tempe, Arizona on Saturday, December 25. Part of the 1976–77 bowl game season, it matched the eighth-ranked Oklahoma Sooners of the Big Eight Conference and the unranked Wyoming Cowboys of the Western Athletic Conference (WAC). Heavily favored Oklahoma won in a rout, 41–7.

This was the first of four consecutive Fiesta Bowls played on Christmas Day.

== Teams ==
This was the first Fiesta Bowl appearance for each. Both teams' offenses ran out of the wishbone formation.

=== Oklahoma ===
Oklahoma was co-champion of the Big Eight Conference for the fifth straight year. They tied Texas and lost to the other co-champions, Oklahoma State and Colorado: CU went to the Orange Bowl and OSU played in the Tangerine Bowl.

=== Wyoming ===
Wyoming was co-champion of the Western Athletic Conference (WAC) and was making their first bowl appearance in nine years, since the 1968 Sugar Bowl. It was the Cowboys' first winning season since 1969.

== Game summary ==
This was the only game of the day, and kicked off shortly after 1 p.m. MST on CBS.

Elvis Peacock started the beating with a touchdown run early in the game and Horace Ivory added in his touchdown run to make it 14–0 after the first quarter. Two Uwe von Schamann field goals made it 20–0 at halftime.

Oklahoma scored three more times in the second half on Peacock, George Cumby, and Woodie Shephard touchdowns. Narrowly avoiding a shutout, Cowboy fullback Robbie Wright scored in the final half-minute to cap a 92-yard drive and make the final score 41–7. This was the biggest margin of victory in the Fiesta Bowl until 1996.

Sooner quarterback Thomas Lott was the offensive MVP and cornerback Terry Peters took the defensive honor.

=== Scoring ===
First quarter

- Oklahoma – Elvis Peacock 3-yard run (Uwe von Schamann kick)
- Oklahoma – Horace Ivory 4-yard run (von Schamann kick)

Second quarter

- Oklahoma – von Schamann 32-yard field goal
- Oklahoma – von Schamann 50-yard field goal

Third quarter

- Oklahoma – Peacock 15-yard run (von Schamann kick)

Fourth quarter

- Oklahoma – George Cumby 4-yard run (von Schamann kick)
- Oklahoma – Woodie Shephard 8-yard run (von Schamann kick)
- Wyoming – Robbie Wright 1-yard run (Dan Christopulos kick)

== Statistics ==
Statistics	Oklahoma	Wyoming
First downs	24	14
Yards rushing	76–415	42–153
Yards passing	23	51
Passing	3–5–0	6–19–5
Return yards	19	0
Total Offense	81–438	61–204
Punts–Average	0–0	5–25.2
Fumbles–Lost	6–3	5–1
Turnovers	3	6
Penalties–Yards	2–20	4–30

== Aftermath ==
Oklahoma climbed to fifth in the final AP poll. The Sooners returned to the Fiesta Bowl six years later; through 2026, this is Wyoming's only appearance.
