= Mike Baldassin =

American football player (born 1955)

No. 41
- Position: Linebacker

Personal information
- Born: July 26, 1955 (age 71); Tacoma, Washington, U.S.
- Listed height: 6 ft 1 in (1.85 m)
- Listed weight: 218 lb (99 kg)

Career information
- High school: Woodrow Wilson (Tacoma)
- College: Washington
- NFL draft: 1977: undrafted

Career history
- San Francisco 49ers (1977–1978)
- Stats at Pro Football Reference

Michael Robert Baldassin (born July 26, 1955) is an American former professional football player who was a linebacker for two seasons with the San Francisco 49ers of the National Football League (NFL). He played college football for the Washington Huskies.

== High school ==
Baldassin was born in Tacoma, Washington, and played at Woodrow Wilson High School where he was an All-State third baseman and also earned team MVP and All-City football honors. He originally signed to play football at the University of Puget Sound, but his performance in the East-West All-Star drew interest from several Pac-8 schools, including Washington.

== College career ==
Baldassin enrolled at the University of Washington in 1973, where he earned three varsity letters from 1974 to 1976. He led the team in tackles in both 1975 and 1976, leading the nation as well in 1976, achieving several season and career records for tackles. He was a captain of the 1976 team. and was awarded both the team's "Most Inspirational" and "Most Improved" awards.

== Professional career ==
Baldassin was not drafted, but played two seasons for the San Francisco 49ers.

== Later life ==
Baldassin became a police officer in both Oakland and Seattle, earning the Medal of Valor in Oakland. He later became a teacher and coach at Bellarmine Preparatory School, serving as head football coach from 1996 to 2002. He won three league championships and made four state playoff appearances, and was recognized with multiple Coach of the Year honors.

== See also ==
- Washington Huskies football statistical leaders
