= 1976 UTEP Miners football team =

American college football season

1976 UTEP Miners football
- Conference: Western Athletic Conference
- Record: 1–11 (0–7 WAC)
- Head coach: Gil Bartosh (3rd season)
- Home stadium: Sun Bowl

1976 Western Athletic Conference football standings
	Conf.					Overall
Team	W		L		T	W		L		T
BYU +	6	–	1	–	0	9	–	3	–	0
Wyoming +	6	–	1	–	0	8	–	4	–	0
Arizona State	4	–	3	–	0	4	–	7	–	0
Utah	3	–	3	–	0	3	–	8	–	0
Arizona	3	–	4	–	0	5	–	6	–	0
New Mexico	3	–	4	–	0	4	–	7	–	0
Colorado State	2	–	4	–	0	6	–	5	–	0
UTEP	0	–	7	–	0	1	–	11	–	0
+ – Conference co-champions

The 1976 UTEP Miners football team was an American football team that represented the University of Texas at El Paso in the Western Athletic Conference during the 1976 NCAA Division I football season. In their third year under head coach Gil Bartosh, the team compiled a 1–11 record.

== Schedule ==
Date	Opponent	Site	Result	Attendance	Source
September 4	UT Arlington*	Sun Bowl; El Paso, TX	W 38–15	16,650	
September 11	at New Mexico State*	Memorial Stadium; Las Cruces, NM (rivalry)	L 10–13	13,155	
September 18	New Mexico	Sun Bowl; El Paso, TX	L 7–25	18,750	
October 2	at Utah	Robert Rice Stadium; Salt Lake City, UT	L 14–38	20,111	
October 9	at Arizona	Arizona Stadium; Tucson, AZ	L 12–63	42,177	
October 16	Arizona State^{†}	Sun Bowl; El Paso, TX	L 6–23	15,500	
October 23	at Colorado State	Hughes Stadium; Fort Collins, CO	L 7–28	18,652	
October 30	San Diego State*	Sun Bowl; El Paso, TX	L 16–27	9,500	
November 6	at BYU	Cougar Stadium; Provo, UT	L 27–40	24,644	
November 13	Wyoming	Sun Bowl; El Paso, TX	L 10–14	4,200	
November 20	at Hawaii*	Aloha Stadium; Halawa, HI	L 12–28	14,169	
November 27	No. 14 Oklahoma State*	Sun Bowl; El Paso, TX	L 13–42	5,700	
*Non-conference game; ^{†}Homecoming; Rankings from AP Poll released prior to the game
