= 1976 New Mexico Lobos football team =

American college football season

1976 New Mexico Lobos football
- Conference: Western Athletic Conference
- Record: 4–7 (3–4 WAC)
- Head coach: Bill Mondt (3rd season)
- Home stadium: University Stadium

1976 Western Athletic Conference football standings
	Conf.					Overall
Team	W		L		T	W		L		T
BYU +	6	–	1	–	0	9	–	3	–	0
Wyoming +	6	–	1	–	0	8	–	4	–	0
Arizona State	4	–	3	–	0	4	–	7	–	0
Utah	3	–	3	–	0	3	–	8	–	0
Arizona	3	–	4	–	0	5	–	6	–	0
New Mexico	3	–	4	–	0	4	–	7	–	0
Colorado State	2	–	4	–	0	6	–	5	–	0
UTEP	0	–	7	–	0	1	–	11	–	0
+ – Conference co-champions

The 1976 New Mexico Lobos football team was an American football team that represented the University of New Mexico in the Western Athletic Conference (WAC) during the 1976 NCAA Division I football season. In their third season under head coach Bill Mondt, the Lobos compiled a 4–7 record (3–4 against WAC opponents) and were outscored by a total of 235 to 229.

Robin Cole and Dave Green were the team captains. The team's statistical leaders included Noel Mazzone with 1,427 passing yards, Mike Williams with 1,240 rushing yards and 66 points scored, Preston Dennard with 783 receiving yards.

== Schedule ==
Date	Opponent	Site	Result	Attendance	Source
September 18	at UTEP	Sun Bowl; El Paso, TX	W 25–7	18,750	
September 25	No. 20 Texas Tech*	University Stadium; Albuquerque, NM	L 16–20	28,501	
October 2	at Colorado State	Hughes Stadium; Fort Collins, CO	W 33–20	21,719	
October 9	San Jose State*	University Stadium; Albuquerque, NM	W 36–30	23,545	
October 16	at Wyoming	War Memorial Stadium; Laramie, WY	L 23–24	23,649	
October 23	at Arizona State	Sun Devil Stadium; Tempe, AZ	L 15–31	48,547	
October 30	New Mexico State*^{†}	University Stadium; Albuquerque, NM (rivalry)	L 7–16	23,236	
November 6	at Utah	Robert Rice Stadium; Salt Lake City, UT	L 31–34	19,231	
November 13	BYU	University Stadium; Albuquerque, NM	L 8–21	18,038	
November 20	Arizona	University Stadium; Albuquerque, NM (rivalry)	W 21–15	15,121	
November 27	at San Diego State*	San Diego Stadium; San Diego, CA	L 14–17	27,526	
*Non-conference game; ^{†}Homecoming; Rankings from AP Poll released prior to the game
