= Tom Lovat =

American gridiron football player and coach (born 1938)

Biographical details
- Born: December 28, 1938 (age 87); Bingham, Utah, U.S.

Playing career
- 1958–1960: Utah
- Positions: Guard, linebacker

Coaching career (HC unless noted)
- 1967: Utah (DL)
- 1968–1970: Idaho State (OL)
- 1971: Saskatchewan Roughriders (DC)
- 1972–1973: Utah (assistant)
- 1974–1976: Utah
- 1977–1979: Stanford (OL)
- 1980: Green Bay Packers (asst. OL)
- 1981–1984: St. Louis Cardinals (OL)
- 1985–1988: Indianapolis Colts (OL)
- 1989: Wyoming Cowboys (OL)
- 1990–1991: Phoenix Cardinals (OL)
- 1992–1998: Green Bay Packers (OL)
- 1999–2003: Seattle Seahawks (OL)
- 2007: Cologne Centurions (OL)

Head coaching record
- Overall: 5–28

Thomas Lovat (born December 28, 1938) is an American former football coach.

Lovat started coaching at his alma mater Utah as the defensive line coach in 1967. Next he went to Idaho State University (1968–70) and worked with the defensive secondary and offensive line. Then Lovat moved on to the Canadian Football League (CFL) as the defensive coordinator for the Saskatchewan Roughriders (1971), and then went back to Utah as an assistant in 1972 under Bill Meek, was promoted to head coach in 1974, and lasted three seasons.

Next Lovat coached offensive line at Stanford University from 1977 to 1979 under Bill Walsh. Then he moved up to the National Football League (NFL), hired by Bart Starr of the Green Bay Packers as the assistant offensive line coach in 1980, and then to St. Louis Cardinals under Jim Hanifan from 1981 to 1984, as line coach. Then he coached the Indianapolis Colts from 1985 to 1988; and back to the Cardinals when the team moved to Phoenix, coaching under Joe Bugel, as his line coach from 1990 to 1991. Then he was hired by new head coach Mike Holmgren with the Packers 1992, moved with him to the Seattle Seahawks in 1999, and retired after the 2003 season at age 65.

Lovat's son, Mark Lovat, is currently a strength and conditioning assistant for the Tennessee Titans .

== Head coaching record ==
Year	Team	Overall	Conference	Standing	Bowl/playoffs
Utah Utes (Western Athletic Conference) (1974–1976)
1974	Utah	1–10	1–5	7th	
1975	Utah	1–10	1–4	6th	
1976	Utah	3–8	3–3	4th	
Utah:		5–28	5–12		
Total:		5–28			
