= Jack Thompson (American football) =

American football player (born 1956)

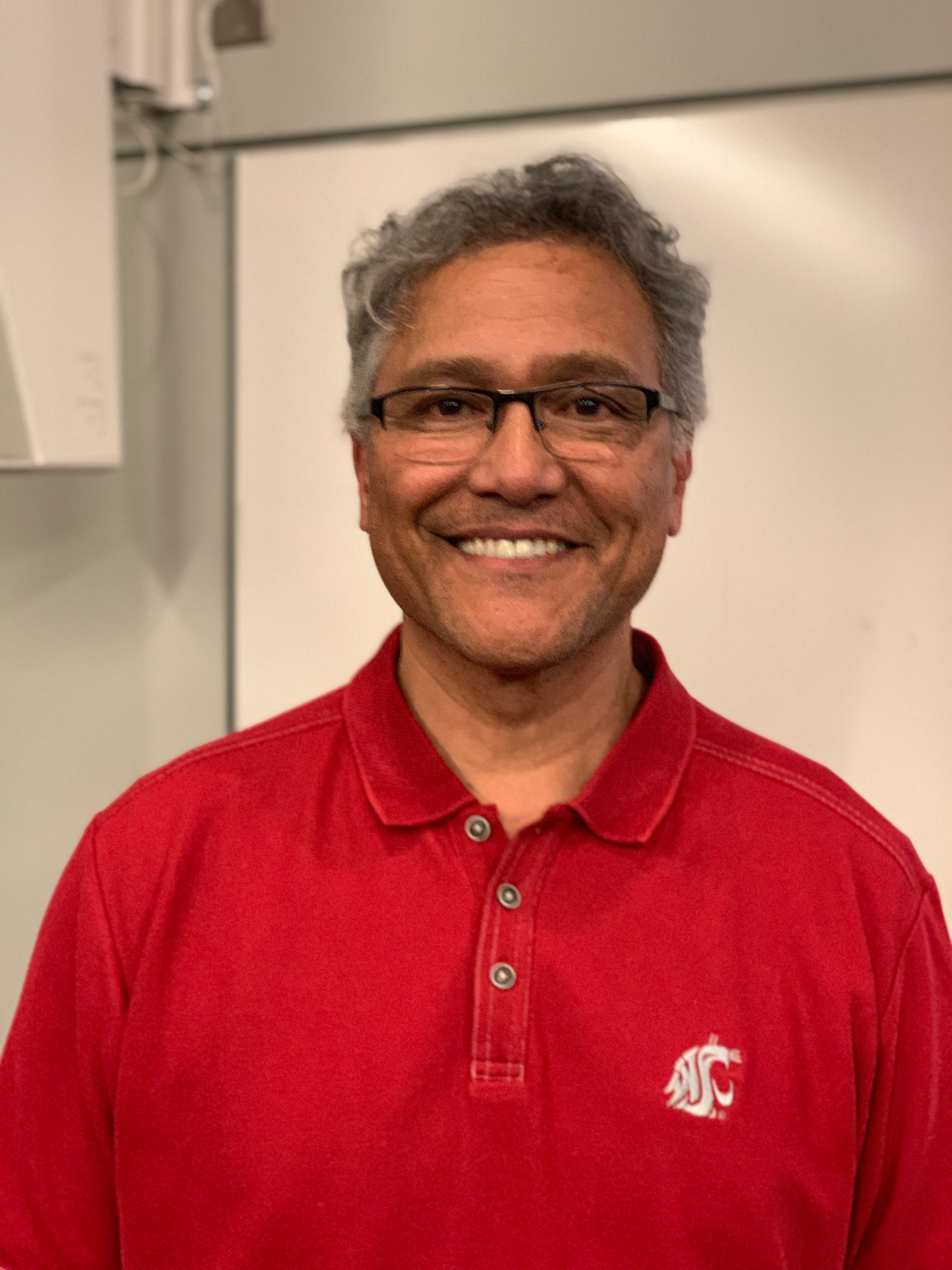
- Thompson in 2019, at Mike Leach's; Insurgent Warfare and Football Strategy class

No. 12, 14
- Position: Quarterback

Personal information
- Born: May 19, 1956 (age 70); Tutuila, American Samoa
- Listed height: 6 ft 3 in (1.91 m)
- Listed weight: 217 lb (98 kg)

Career information
- High school: Evergreen (White Center, Washington, U.S.)
- College: Washington State
- NFL draft: 1979: 1st round, 3rd overall pick

Career history
- Cincinnati Bengals (1979–1982); Tampa Bay Buccaneers (1983–1984)

Awards and highlights
- 2× First-team All-Pac-8/Pac-10 (1976, 1978); Second-team All-Pac-8 (1977); Washington State Cougars No. 14 retired

Career NFL statistics
- Passing attempts: 845
- Passing completions: 449
- Completion percentage: 53.1%
- TD–INT: 33-45
- Passing yards: 5,315
- Passer rating: 63.4
- Stats at Pro Football Reference

Jack Byron Thompson (born May 18, 1956), nicknamed "the Throwin' Samoan", is an American Samoan former professional football quarterback. Thompson played in the National Football League (NFL) for six seasons, four with the Cincinnati Bengals and two with the Tampa Bay Buccaneers. He played college football for the Washington State Cougars. He was selected by the Bengals in the first round of the 1979 NFL draft with the third overall pick.

His nickname was bestowed on him by Spokesman-Review columnist Harry Missildine during Thompson's breakout sophomore season at Washington State in 1976.

== College career ==
As a collegian at Washington State University in Pullman, Thompson set numerous school, Pac-10 and NCAA records. In the second game of 1976, he took over on offense after senior starter John Hopkins was injured making a tackle in the second quarter at Minnesota. In a 2002 story, Thompson explained why he chose to attend Washington State and how his first series against Minnesota in 1976 was almost his last until offensive coordinator Bob Leahy convinced head coach Jackie Sherrill to leave Thompson in the game.

As a fifth year senior in 1978, Thompson finished ninth in the voting for the Heisman Trophy, and concluded his college career as the most prolific passer in NCAA history with 7,818 passing yards. Thompson set Pac-10 records for attempts, completions, and TD passes. He was all-conference three times and either 1st team or 2nd team, or honorable mention All-American three times.

Thompson is one of only two players in school history to have his number retired (with Pro Football Hall of Famer Mel Hein); he wore No. 14 and graduated from Evergreen High School in White Center, Washington, in 1974, south of Seattle.

=== College statistics ===
Legend
	Pac-8/Pac-10 record
	Led the Pac-8/Pac-10
	NCAA record
	Led the NCAA
**Bold**	Career high

Season	Team	GP	Cmp	Att	Pct	Yds	TD	Int	Rtg
1975	Washington State	**11**	26	54	48.1	351	3	**2**	113.7
1976	Washington State	**11**	**208**	**355**	**58.6**	**2,762**	**20**	14	**134.7**
1977	Washington State	**11**	192	329	58.4	2,372	13	13	124.1
1978	Washington State	**11**	175	348	50.3	2,333	17	20	111.2
Career		44	601	1,086	55.3	7,818	53	49	122.9

== NFL career ==
Thompson was the first quarterback selected in the 1979 NFL draft, taken third overall by the Cincinnati Bengals. At the time, the team had 30 year old Ken Anderson as their starter, who had just finished his seventh season as the starter for a team that went 4–8. Team president and founder Paul Brown felt the need to draft a successor to Anderson to help the team despite projections that saw the New York Giants pick him at the seventh spot. Thompson was tabbed as the backup for Anderson, who started the first three weeks of the season. Thompson was put in mop-up duty for the second game before throwing twenty passes in the second game in a 20–14 loss to the New England Patriots; on the run in both games, he had a touchdown in each one. In week four against the Houston Oilers, he was tabbed to start. He went 11-of-21 for 181 yards with an interception while being sacked seven times and running for zero yards in a 30–27 loss. He did not start another game that year, but he did make appearances in five subsequent games in relief. In total, he threw for one touchdown and five interceptions while running for five touchdowns.

The following year saw Anthony Munoz drafted to provide support in the tackle position while Thompson and Anderson vied for playing time under new head coach Forrest Gregg. On opening day of 1980, Thompson was tabbed as the starter against the Tampa Bay Buccaneers. The game did not go well, as he completed 6-of-21 for 47 yards with a touchdown and an interception in a miserable 17–12 loss. He was tabbed to come in for Anderson in the following two games, which included going 9-for-18 with 122 yards and two touchdowns that saw Cincinnati beat Pittsburgh 30–28. He was then tasked to start the following week against Houston and went 14-of-24 for 134 yards with a touchdown and an interception, but a last-minute drive to tie fell short in a 13–10 loss. He played sparingly for the next eleven weeks before being tabbed to start the final two games of the year against Chicago and Cleveland. In total, he threw for 1,324 yards while running for 84 that saw eleven touchdown passes to twelve interceptions while the Bengals as a whole won just six games.

1981 was a turning point, but not for Thompson. Anderson threw three interceptions in the first half of the opening game against the Seattle Seahawks, but Thompson had suffered a sprained ankle injury in the preseason, which meant that Gregg went to Turk Schonert in relief that saw a wild comeback win. As related by Thompson later, “I was in a quarterback meeting talking to Kenny and I remember him looking at me and saying, ‘I need to be the starter. He was resolved. I said, ‘Why don't you go talk to Forrest and be done with it?’ He did, then went into that New York game and had a great game and we were off and running. I got to witness his ‘Phoenix’ moment. I have nothing but respect for that.” With his job on the line, Anderson proceeded to have a standout season that saw them go all the way to Super Bowl season while Thompson threw just 49 passes in mopup duty. His final pass as a Bengal was in the AFC Championship Game, dubbed as the "Freezer Bowl" due to the subzero temperatures that saw him come in and complete a 14-yard pass when Anderson was checked up for a time.

Thompson went to the Tampa Bay Buccaneers in 1983 and was the starter, but he was replaced in the following year by Steve DeBerg.

In 2008, ESPN ranked Thompson no. 26 among the 50 worst NFL draft busts.

== NFL career statistics ==
=== Regular season ===
Year	Team	Games			Passing									Rushing				Sacked		Fumbles	
Year	Team	GP	GS	Record	Cmp	Att	Pct	Yds	Y/A	Lng	TD	Int	Rtg	Att	Yds	Avg	TD	Sck	Yds	Fum	Lost
1979	CIN	9	1	0–1	39	87	44.8	481	5.5	50	1	5	42.4	21	116	5.5	5	16	178	3	1
1980	CIN	14	4	1–3	115	234	49.1	1,324	5.7	59	11	12	60.9	18	84	4.7	1	13	113	5	3
1981	CIN	8	0	—	21	49	42.9	267	5.4	21	1	2	50.3	0	0	0.0	0	7	61	0	0
1982	CIN	1	0	—	0	0	0.0	0	0.0	0	0	0	0.0	0	0	0.0	0	0	0	0	0
1983	TB	14	13	2–11	249	423	58.9	2,906	6.9	80	18	21	73.3	26	27	1.0	0	39	289	10	5
1984	TB	5	3	1–2	25	52	48.1	337	6.5	74	2	5	42.4	5	35	7.0	0	10	54	1	1
Total		51	21	4–17	449	845	53.1	5,315	6.3	80	33	45	63.4	70	262	3.7	6	85	695	19	10

=== Playoffs ===
Year	Team	Games			Passing									Rushing				Sacked		Fumbles	
Year	Team	GP	GS	Record	Cmp	Att	Pct	Yds	Y/A	Lng	TD	Int	Rtg	Att	Yds	Avg	TD	Sck	Yds	Fum	Lost
1981	CIN	2	0	—	1	1	100.0	14	14.0	14	0	0	118.7	0	0	0.0	0	0	0	0	0
Total		2	0	—	1	1	100.0	14	14.0	14	0	0	118.7	0	0	0.0	0	0	0	0	0

== Personal life ==
After his football career, Thompson settled in Seattle and became a mortgage banker, as well as a volunteer quarterbacks coach at Ballard High School. His son Tony, a tight end, followed in his dad's footsteps in suiting up at Washington State, and a nephew, Tavita Pritchard, was a quarterback at Stanford University and is now back at Stanford as the head coach.

Thompson's cousin, Samoa Samoa, was drafted by the Bengals in 1981.
