= 1976 Arizona Wildcats football team =

American college football season

1976 Arizona Wildcats football
- Conference: Western Athletic Conference
- Record: 5–6 (3–4 WAC)
- Head coach: Jim Young (4th season)
- Offensive coordinator: John Mackovic (4th season)
- Home stadium: Arizona Stadium

1976 Western Athletic Conference football standings
	Conf.					Overall
Team	W		L		T	W		L		T
BYU +	6	–	1	–	0	9	–	3	–	0
Wyoming +	6	–	1	–	0	8	–	4	–	0
Arizona State	4	–	3	–	0	4	–	7	–	0
Utah	3	–	3	–	0	3	–	8	–	0
Arizona	3	–	4	–	0	5	–	6	–	0
New Mexico	3	–	4	–	0	4	–	7	–	0
Colorado State	2	–	4	–	0	6	–	5	–	0
UTEP	0	–	7	–	0	1	–	11	–	0
+ – Conference co-champions

The 1976 Arizona Wildcats football team represented the University of Arizona in the Western Athletic Conference (WAC) during the 1976 NCAA Division I football season. In their fourth and final season under head coach Jim Young, the Wildcats compiled a 5–6 record (3–4 against WAC opponents), finished in a tie for fifth place in the WAC, and outscored their opponents, 283 to 273. The team played its home games in Arizona Stadium in Tucson, Arizona. Young left Arizona to become head coach at Purdue after the season concluded.

The team's statistical leaders included Marc Lunsford with 1,284 passing yards, Derriak Anderson with 506 rushing yards, and Keith Hartwig with 1,134 receiving yards. Linebacker Obra Erby led the team with 174 total tackles.

== Before the season ==
Arizona finished the 1975 season with a 9–2 record and missed out on a WAC championship by narrowly losing to Arizona State in the finale. During the offseason, the Wildcats had to replace several starters from the 1975 team due to graduation. When the preseason began, Young still believed that the team would compete for the WAC title despite a rebuilding process.

== Schedule ==
Date	Opponent	Site	Result	Attendance	Source
September 11	Auburn*	Arizona Stadium; Tucson, AZ	W 31–19	52,206	
September 18	at No. 5 UCLA*	Los Angeles Memorial Coliseum; Los Angeles, CA	L 9–37	41,651	
September 25	BYU	Arizona Stadium; Tucson, AZ	L 16–23	31,000	
October 2	at Northwestern*	Dyche Stadium; Evanston, IL	W 27–15	23,097	
October 9	UTEP	Arizona Stadium; Tucson, AZ	W 63–12	42,177	
October 23	at No. 8 Texas Tech*	Jones Stadium; Lubbock, TX	L 27–52	44,890	
October 30	at Utah	Robert Rice Stadium; Salt Lake City, UT	W 38–35	18,231	
November 6	Wyoming	Arizona Stadium; Tucson, AZ	L 24–26	52,809	
November 13	Colorado State	Arizona Stadium; Tucson, AZ	W 23–6	44,716	
November 20	at New Mexico	University Stadium; Albuquerque, NM (rivalry)	L 15–21	15,121	
November 27	Arizona State	Arizona Stadium; Tucson, AZ (rivalry)	L 10–27	56,800	
*Non-conference game; Rankings from AP Poll released prior to the game

== Game summaries ==
=== Auburn ===
The Wildcats began the season with their home opener against Auburn. The game was a rematch of the 1968 Sun Bowl, a game in which Auburn won. This time, in front of their home crowd, Arizona was able to get past the Tigers for the win. To date, this remains Arizona's first and only win against an SEC team.

=== UCLA ===
In their road opener, Arizona traveled to UCLA, who was ranked fifth at the time. The Wildcats struggled on both sides of the ball, and could only muster nine points in an ugly loss. The Bruins would be a future conference opponent for the Wildcats, as Arizona (and Arizona State) would join the Pac-8 Conference (which was then called the Pac-10) two years later.

=== UTEP ===
Against UTEP, the Wildcats scored a season-high 63 points as the team played their best all game long.

=== New Mexico ===
Arizona traveled to Albuquerque to take on the New Mexico and was hoping to avenge their loss to the Lobos in the previous year that ended the Wildcats’ chances of an undefeated season. The Wildcats would fight hard and would ultimately come up short against the Lobos. It would be the last time that the Kit Carson Rifle trophy would reside in Albuquerque, as the Wildcats would regain it the following season and would hold possession of it until the rifle's retirement in 1997.

=== Arizona State ===
In the state's annual rivalry game, Arizona looked to get revenge on Arizona State after the Sun Devils defeated the Wildcats in the previous year to capture the WAC title. In this season, Arizona State (who was struggling all season long) would outplay a depleted Wildcat squad to earn yet another rivalry win and kept bragging rights for the state. The loss ended the Wildcats’ season.

== Personnel ==
1976 Arizona Wildcats football team roster
Players			Coaches
Offense: Pos. / # / Name / Class; WR / / Keith Hartwig / Sr	Defense: Pos. / # / Name / Class; S / / Tom Gallagher / Jr	Special teams: Pos. / # / Name / Class; K / / Lee Pistor / Jr	Head coach: Jim Young; Coordinators/assistant coaches Legend: (C) Team captain; (S) Suspended; (I) Ineligible; Injured; Redshirt

== After the season ==
Days after losing the season finale to ASU, Young was hired by Purdue to become their new head coach, as Purdue was struggling to win games and Young wanting more money. It marked a return to the Big Ten for Young, as he had ties to the conference by coaching the defense at Michigan prior to being hired at Arizona in 1973. Arizona would hire Cincinnati coach Tony Mason to take over the program in 1977.

== Season notes ==
- Arizona's season was mostly impacted by several injuries to players, which affected the team's chances of contending for the WAC championship and led to only five wins.
- The 63 points scored against UTEP were the most in a game for the Wildcats under Young.
- The Wildcats lost to both of their rivals (Arizona State and New Mexico) for the second season in a row.
- This season was the last in which Arizona wore helmets with “UA” on them that looked like a snake. The Wildcats introduced red helmets with a blue “A” on them in 1977.
- This was Young's first and only losing season with the Wildcats. Arizona had winning records in Young's first three seasons. Had there been more bowl games back then, Arizona would have made three bowl appearances under Young.
