= 1976 Oregon Ducks football team =

American college football season

1976 Oregon Ducks football
- Conference: Pacific-8 Conference
- Record: 4–7 (1–6 Pac-8)
- Head coach: Don Read (3rd season)
- Captain: Game captains
- Home stadium: Autzen Stadium

1976 Pacific-8 Conference football standings
	Conf.					Overall
Team	W		L		T	W		L		T
No. 2 USC $	7	–	0	–	0	11	–	1	–	0
No. 15 UCLA	6	–	1	–	0	9	–	2	–	1
Stanford	5	–	2	–	0	6	–	5	–	0
California	3	–	4	–	0	5	–	6	–	0
Washington	3	–	4	–	0	5	–	6	–	0
Washington State	2	–	5	–	0	3	–	8	–	0
Oregon	1	–	6	–	0	4	–	7	–	0
Oregon State	1	–	6	–	0	2	–	10	–	0
$ – Conference champion; Rankings from AP Poll

The 1976 Oregon Ducks football team represented the University of Oregon in the Pacific-8 Conference (Pac-8) during the 1976 NCAA Division I football season. Led by third-year head coach Don Read, the Ducks were 4–7 overall (1–6 in the Pac-8, tied for last), and were outscored 271 to 144.

Six days after the season-ending win at Oregon State in the Civil War, Read was fired on the day after Thanksgiving. with a year remaining on a four-year contract ($28,000 annually). He was succeeded by 35-year-old Rich Brooks in mid-December.

== Schedule ==
Date	Time	Opponent	Site	Result	Attendance	Source
September 11	7:30 pm	Colorado State*	Autzen Stadium; Eugene, OR	W 17–3	37,800	
September 18	7:30 pm	USC	Autzen Stadium; Eugene, OR	L 0–53	40,600	
September 25	6:30 pm	at Utah*	Robert Rice Stadium; Salt Lake City, UT	W 21–13	25,617	
October 2	1:30 pm	Utah State*	Autzen Stadium; Eugene, OR	W 27–9	17,300	
October 9	1:30 pm	at California	California Memorial Stadium; Berkeley, CA	L 10–27	37,950	
October 16	11:30 am	at No. 14 Notre Dame*	Notre Dame Stadium; Notre Dame, IN	L 0–41	59,075	
October 23	1:30 pm	at Washington	Husky Stadium; Seattle, WA (rivalry)	L 7–14	38,127	
October 30	1:30 pm	Washington State	Autzen Stadium; Eugene, OR	L 22–23	22,200	
November 6	1:30 pm	at No. 3 UCLA	Los Angeles Memorial Coliseum; Los Angeles, CA	L 0–46	32,158	
November 13	1:30 pm	Stanford	Autzen Stadium; Eugene, OR	L 17–28	18,000	
November 20	1:30 pm	at Oregon State	Parker Stadium; Corvallis, OR (Civil War)	W 23–14	35,611	
*Non-conference game; Rankings from AP Poll released prior to the game; All times are in Pacific time

== Roster ==
1976 Oregon Ducks football team roster
Players
Coaches
Offense

Pos.	#	Name	Class
QB	13	Jack Henderson	Jr
OT	72	Raul Martinez	Sr
TE	84	Dave Miller	Sr
WR	89	Ken Page	So
C	51	Fred Quillan	Jr

Defense

Pos.	#	Name	Class
LB	45	Bruce Beekley	So
LB	56	Tim Beyer	So
DE	93	Mel Cook	Jr
DB	25	Craig Feola	Jr
CB	4	Reggie Grant	Jr
LB	33	Darrell Mehl	Sr
LB	42	Kim Nutting	Jr
DT	70	Rob Plath	Jr
DE	90	John Reed	Sr
DT	96	Rod Rickert	Sr

Special teams

Pos.	#	Name	Class

Head coach

- Don Read (3rd year)

Coordinators/assistant coaches

Legend

- (C) Team captain
- (S) Suspended
- (I) Ineligible
- Injured
- Redshirt
