= 1976 Utah Utes football team =

American college football season

1976 Utah Utes football
- Conference: Western Athletic Conference
- Record: 3–8 (3–3 WAC)
- Head coach: Tom Lovat (3rd season)
- Home stadium: Robert Rice Stadium

1976 Western Athletic Conference football standings
	Conf.					Overall
Team	W		L		T	W		L		T
BYU +	6	–	1	–	0	9	–	3	–	0
Wyoming +	6	–	1	–	0	8	–	4	–	0
Arizona State	4	–	3	–	0	4	–	7	–	0
Utah	3	–	3	–	0	3	–	8	–	0
Arizona	3	–	4	–	0	5	–	6	–	0
New Mexico	3	–	4	–	0	4	–	7	–	0
Colorado State	2	–	4	–	0	6	–	5	–	0
UTEP	0	–	7	–	0	1	–	11	–	0
+ – Conference co-champions

The 1976 Utah Utes football team was an American football team that represented the University of Utah as a member of the Western Athletic Conference (WAC) during the 1976 NCAA Division I football season. In their third and final season under head coach Tom Lovat, the Utes compiled an overall record of 3–8 with a mark of 3–3 against conference opponents, placing fourth in the WAC. Home games were played on campus at Robert Rice Stadium in Salt Lake City.

== Schedule ==
Date	Time	Opponent	Site	Result	Attendance	Source
September 18	6:30 pm	at Rice*	Rice Stadium; Houston, TX	L 22–43	17,000	
September 25	7:30 pm	Oregon*	Robert Rice Stadium; Salt Lake City, UT	L 13–21	25,617	
October 2	7:30 pm	UTEP	Robert Rice Stadium; Salt Lake City, UT	W 38–14	20,111	
October 9	11:30 am	at Iowa State*	Cyclone Stadium; Ames, IA	L 14–44	36,457	
October 16	1:30 pm	at Utah State*	Romney Stadium; Logan, UT (rivalry)	L 17–28	18,322	
October 23	1:30 pm	at Wyoming	War Memorial Stadium; Laramie, WY	L 22–45	20,609	
October 30	1:30 pm	Arizona	Robert Rice Stadium; Salt Lake City, UT	L 35–38	18,231	
November 6	1:30 pm	New Mexico^{†}	Robert Rice Stadium; Salt Lake City, UT	W 34–31	19,231	
November 13	7:30 pm	at Arizona State	Sun Devil Stadium; Tempe, AZ	W 31–28	40,076	
November 20	1:30 pm	BYU	Robert Rice Stadium; Salt Lake City, UT (rivalry)	L 12–34	30,503	
November 27	5:30 pm	at LSU*	Tiger Stadium; Baton Rouge, LA	L 7–35	48,455	
*Non-conference game; ^{†}Homecoming; All times are in Mountain time

== Game summaries ==
=== BYU ===
BYU Cougars (8–2) at Utah Utes (3–6)

Quarter	1	2	3	4	Total
BYU	7	13	14	0	34
Utah	0	6	0	6	12

at Rice Stadium, Salt Lake City, Utah

- Date: November 20, 1976
- Game weather: Clear, 56 °F (13 °C)
- Game attendance: 30,503
- Box Score

Game information

First quarter

- BYU – Gifford Nielsen 6-yard run (Dave Taylor kick). BYU 7–0.

Second quarter

- BYU – Mike Chronister 3-yard pass from Gifford Nielsen (). BYU 13–0.
- UTAH – Steve Peake 3-yard run. BYU 13–6.
- BYU – George Harris 25-yard pass from Gifford Nielsen (Dave Taylor kick). BYU 20–6.

Third quarter

- BYU – Jeff Blanc 19-yard pass from Gifford Nielsen (Dave Taylor kick). BYU 27–6.
- BYU – Dave Lowry 2-yard run (Dave Taylor kick). BYU 34–6.

Fourth quarter

- UTAH – Richard Graham 3-yard pass from Patrick Degnan. BYU 34–13.

Top passers

- BYU – Gifford Nielsen – 25/35, 415 yards, 3 TD, 3 INT
- UTAH – Patrick Degnan – 19/42, 270 yards, TD, INT

Top rushers

- BYU – Todd Christensen – 8 rushes, 53 yards
- UTAH – Steve Peake – 13 rushes, 46 yards, TD

Top receivers

- BYU – George Harris – 6 receptions, 134 yards, TD
- UTAH – Michael Cordy – 6 receptions, 117 yards

External videos
- Game highlights

== Personnel ==
1976 Utah Utes football team roster
Players			Coaches
Offense: Pos. / # / Name / Class; QB / / Patrick Degnan	Defense: Pos. / # / Name / Class	Special teams: Pos. / # / Name / Class; K / / Thomas McNamara	Head coach: Tom Lovat; Coordinators/assistant coaches Legend: (C) Team captain; (S) Suspended; (I) Ineligible; Injured; Redshirt
