= Ricky Bell (running back) =

American football player (1955–1984)

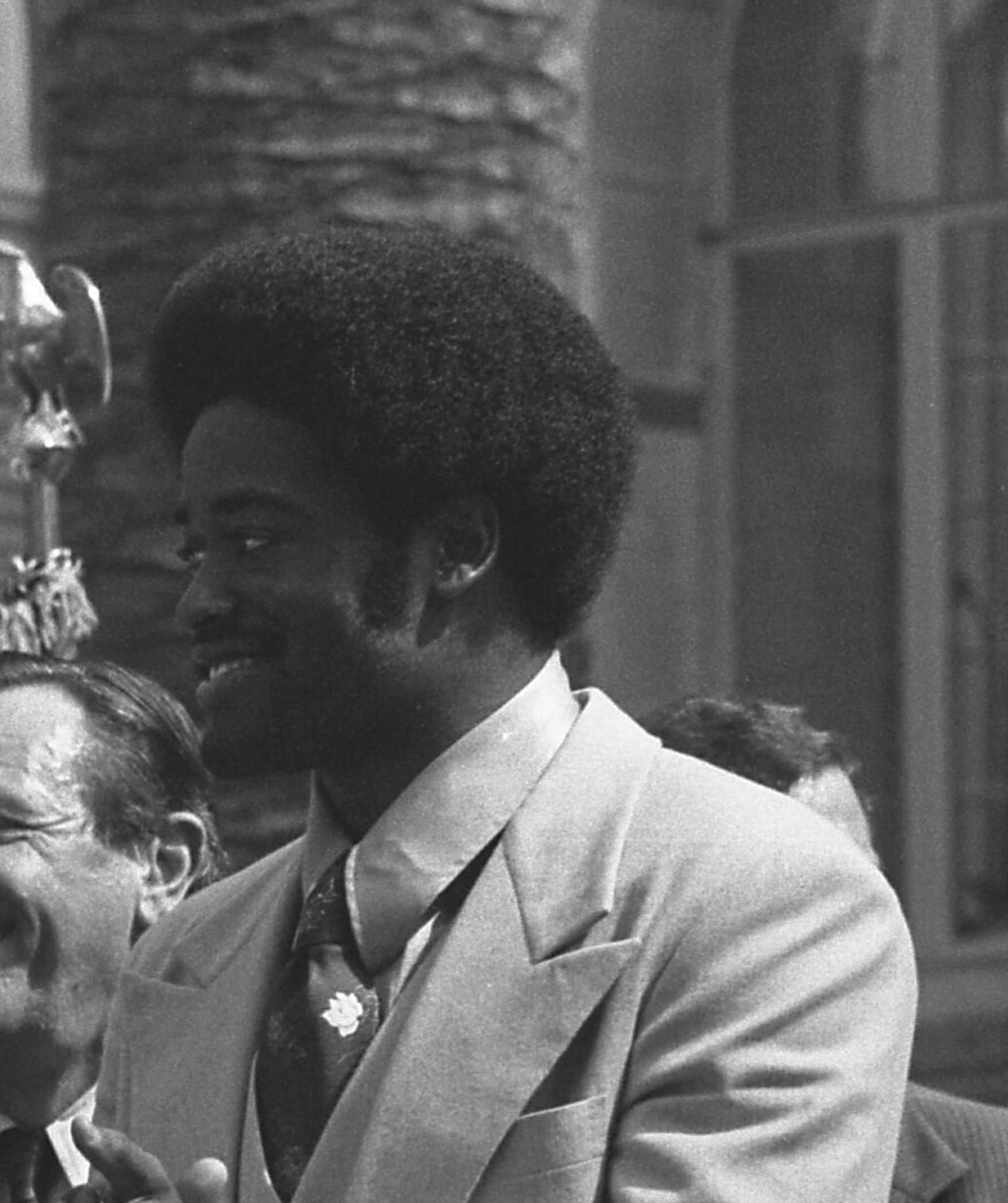
- Bell in 1976

No. 42
- Position: Running back

Personal information
- Born: April 8, 1955; Houston, Texas, U.S.
- Died: November 28, 1984 (aged 29); Los Angeles, California, U.S.
- Listed height: 6 ft 2 in (1.88 m)
- Listed weight: 220 lb (100 kg)

Career information
- High school: Fremont (Los Angeles)
- College: USC (1973–1976)
- NFL draft: 1977: 1st round, 1st overall pick

Career history
- Tampa Bay Buccaneers (1977–1981); San Diego Chargers (1982)

Awards and highlights
- Tampa Stadium Krewe of Honor (1991); National champion (1974); 2× Unanimous All-American (1975, 1976); Pac-8 Player of the Year (1976); Pop Warner Trophy (1976); 2× First-team All-Pac-8 (1975, 1976)

Career NFL statistics
- Rushing attempts: 822
- Rushing yards: 3,063
- Rushing touchdowns: 16
- Stats at Pro Football Reference
- College Football Hall of Fame

Ricky Lynn Bell (April 8, 1955 – November 28, 1984) was an American professional football player who was a running back for the Tampa Bay Buccaneers and San Diego Chargers of the National Football League (NFL). Bell played college football for the USC Trojans, gaining 1,875 yards rushing in his junior season. The first overall pick in the 1977 NFL draft, Bell was inducted posthumously into the College Football Hall of Fame in 2004.

== Early life ==
Born in Houston, Bell moved to Los Angeles at age eleven and starred in football at its John C. Fremont High School.

Bell was the brother of Archie Bell, lead singer of the 1960s R & B group Archie Bell & the Drells Ricky was 5 out of 7 brothers in the family.

== College career ==
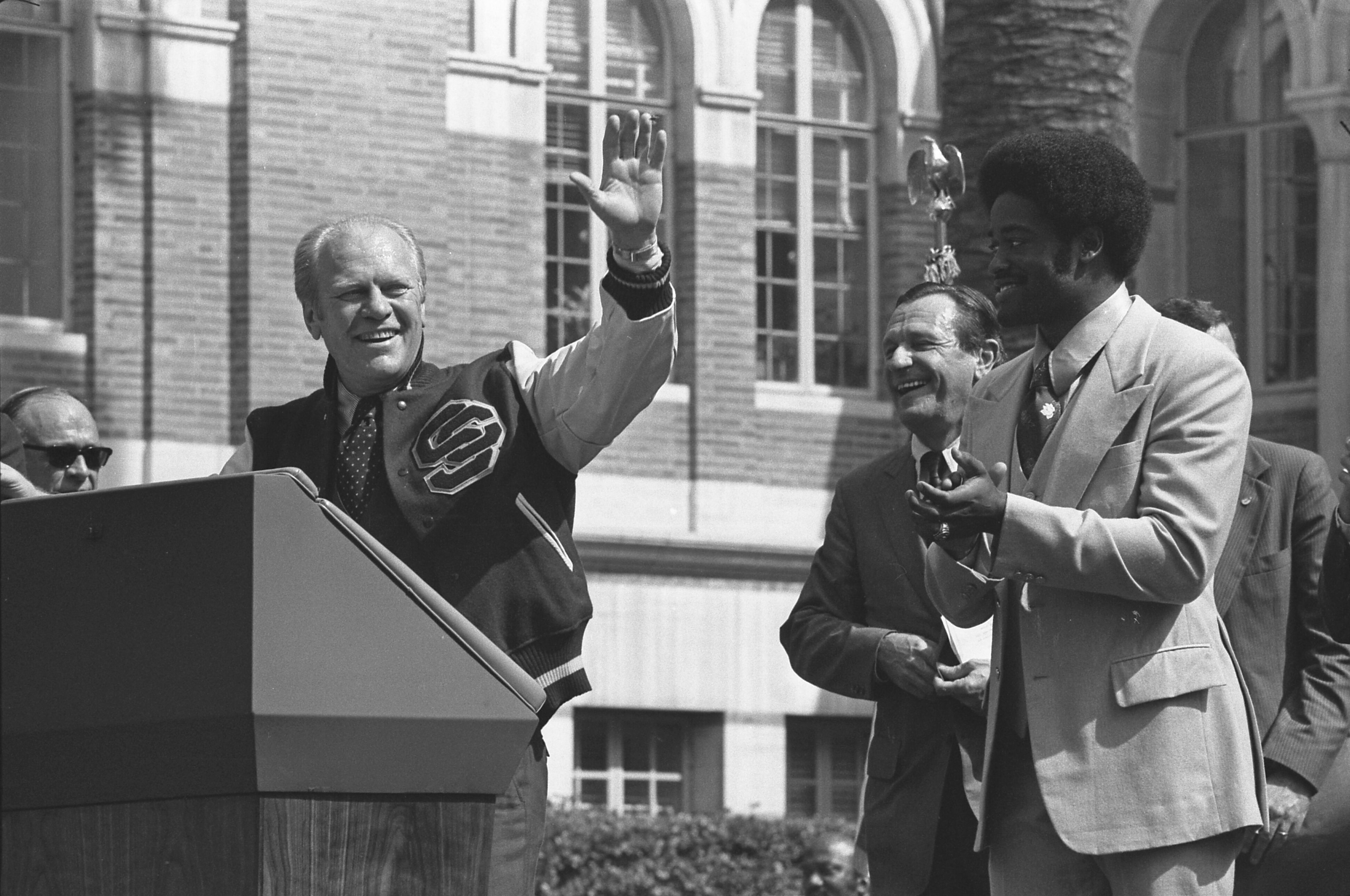
Bell with President Gerald Ford in 1976

Originally a linebacker, Bell first attracted notice during his sophomore season at USC in 1974 as a great blocker and between-the-tackles runner, sharing the position of fullback with David Farmer for the 10–1–1 national championship team (UPI) that defeated third-ranked Ohio State 18–17 in the Rose Bowl on New Year's Day.

In 1975, the Trojans won their first seven games. Without a passing game to balance the offense, they struggled to an 8–4 record, but was capped with a victory over Texas A&M in the Liberty Bowl. During this season, Bell led the nation in rushing, gaining 1,875 yards, as he finished third in the voting for the Heisman Trophy and was a consensus All-American.

In his senior season of 1976, Bell led the Trojans team to an 11–1 record, crowned by a 14–6 victory over the Michigan Wolverines in the Rose Bowl. Despite suffering nagging injuries that limited his playing time, Bell set the USC single-game rushing record of 347 yards against Washington State at the new Kingdome; he was the runner-up for the Heisman, behind Tony Dorsett of Pittsburgh, the national champions.

Bell was voted the player of the year in the Pacific-8 Conference in 1976. He was also awarded the 1976 W. J. Voit Memorial Trophy as the outstanding football player on the Pacific Coast and was again a consensus All-American.

== NFL career ==
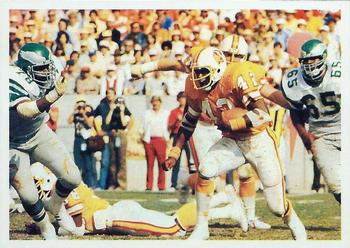
Bell leading Tampa Bay to their first franchise playoff win in 1979

Bell was the first overall pick in the 1977 NFL draft by the Tampa Bay Buccaneers. Bell signed a five-year contract for a reported $1.2 million, by far the richest contract ever signed by an NFL rookie. This draft choice was somewhat controversial because Tony Dorsett was being projected as an arguably better back than Bell. Bell's selection was not a surprise, however, because Tampa Bay was coached by John McKay, Bell's former head coach at USC through 1975. After a couple mediocre seasons, in 1979, Bell enjoyed his finest season, rushing for 1,263 yards and leading the Buccaneers to the championship of the NFC Central Division. He led the Buccaneers to their first playoff win in franchise history that season by rushing for 142 yards on 38 carries and scoring two touchdowns against the Philadelphia Eagles. The team fell one game short of a trip to Super Bowl XIV, ending their season by losing to the Los Angeles Rams for the NFC championship.

In March 1982, Tampa Bay traded him to the San Diego Chargers, but they put him on injured reserve before the season ended. With weight loss, open sores to go along with swollen hands and feet, Bell was sent to an arthritis specialist. In January 1983, he was diagnosed with cardiomyopathy. He explored alternatives, such as acupuncture, to manage his condition, but ultimately retired in August of 1983. To the general public, he put on a hopeful face, not letting people besides his immediate family know about the severity of the disease in terms of pain. He had been 225 pounds in his playing days but was around 180 at the time of his death.

== NFL career statistics ==
Legend
**Bold**	Career high

=== Regular season ===
Year	Team	Games		Rushing					Receiving				
Year	Team	GP	GS	Att	Yds	Avg	Lng	TD	Rec	Yds	Avg	Lng	TD
1977	TB	11	10	148	436	2.9	20	1	11	88	8.0	23	0
1978	TB	12	9	185	679	3.7	**56**	6	15	122	8.1	22	0
1979	TB	**16**	**16**	**283**	**1,263**	**4.5**	49	**7**	25	248	9.9	**26**	**2**
1980	TB	14	12	174	599	3.4	40	2	**38**	**292**	7.7	22	1
1981	TB	7	3	30	80	2.7	8	0	8	92	**11.5**	22	0
1982	SD	4	0	2	6	3.0	4	0	0	0	0.0	0	0
Career		64	50	822	3,063	3.7	56	16	97	842	8.7	26	3

=== Playoffs ===
Year	Team	Games		Rushing					Receiving				
Year	Team	GP	GS	Att	Yds	Avg	Lng	TD	Rec	Yds	Avg	Lng	TD
1979	TB	**2**	**2**	**58**	**201**	**3.5**	**26**	**2**	**2**	**12**	**6.0**	**11**	0
Career		2	2	58	201	3.5	26	2	2	12	6.0	11	0

== Death ==
Bell died at age 29 of heart failure caused by dermatomyositis. Mario Van Peebles portrayed Bell in the 1991 made-for-television movie A Triumph of the Heart: The Ricky Bell Story. Bell's remains were interred in Inglewood Park Cemetery in Inglewood, California.

He was survived by his wife, Natalia; his 10-year-old son, Ricky Jr., a 3-year-old daughter, Noelle, his mother, Ruthie, and brothers Mac Arthur, Archie, Billy, Langston, Lee and Chester.

== Honors ==
- Bell was elected to the College Football Hall of Fame in 2003.

== See also ==
- List of college football yearly rushing leaders
