= 1976 BYU Cougars football team =

American college football season

1976 BYU Cougars football

WAC co-champion

Tangerine Bowl, L 21–49 vs. Oklahoma State
- Conference: Western Athletic Conference
- Record: 9–3 (6–1 WAC)
- Head coach: LaVell Edwards (5th season)
- Offensive coordinator: Doug Scovil (1st season)
- Offensive scheme: West Coast
- Defensive coordinator: Dick Felt (5th season)
- Base defense: 4–3
- Home stadium: Cougar Stadium

1976 Western Athletic Conference football standings
| | Conf. | | | | | Overall |
| Team | W | | L | | T | W | | L | | T |
|---|---|---|---|---|---|---|---|---|---|---|
| BYU + | 6 | – | 1 | – | 0 | 9 | – | 3 | – | 0 |
| Wyoming + | 6 | – | 1 | – | 0 | 8 | – | 4 | – | 0 |
| Arizona State | 4 | – | 3 | – | 0 | 4 | – | 7 | – | 0 |
| Utah | 3 | – | 3 | – | 0 | 3 | – | 8 | – | 0 |
| Arizona | 3 | – | 4 | – | 0 | 5 | – | 6 | – | 0 |
| New Mexico | 3 | – | 4 | – | 0 | 4 | – | 7 | – | 0 |
| Colorado State | 2 | – | 4 | – | 0 | 6 | – | 5 | – | 0 |
| UTEP | 0 | – | 7 | – | 0 | 1 | – | 11 | – | 0 |
+ – Conference co-champions

The 1976 BYU Cougars football team represented Brigham Young University during the 1976 NCAA Division I football season. The Cougars were led by fifth-year head coach LaVell Edwards and played their home games at Cougar Stadium in Provo, Utah. The team competed as a member of the Western Athletic Conference, winning a share of the conference title with Wyoming with a conference record of 6–1. BYU was invited to the 1976 Tangerine Bowl, where they lost to Oklahoma State.

== Schedule ==
| Date | Opponent | Site | Result | Attendance | Source |
|---|---|---|---|---|---|
| September 11 | at Kansas State* | KSU Stadium; Manhattan, KS | L 3–13 | 27,100 | |
| September 18 | Colorado State | Cougar Stadium; Provo, UT | W 42–18 | 33,013 | |
| September 25 | at Arizona | Arizona Stadium; Tucson, AZ | W 23–16 | 31,000 | |
| October 2 | at San Diego State* | San Diego Stadium; San Diego, CA | W 8–0 | 41,786 | |
| October 9 | Wyoming^{†} | Cougar Stadium; Provo, UT | L 29–34 | 35,423 | |
| October 10 | Southern Miss* | Cougar Stadium; Provo, UT | W 63–19 | 23,029 | |
| October 23 | Utah State* | Cougar Stadium; Provo, UT (rivalry) | W 45–14 | 24,124 | |
| October 30 | Arizona State | Cougar Stadium; Provo, UT | W 43–21 | 29,854 | |
| November 6 | UTEP | Cougar Stadium; Provo, UT | W 40–27 | 24,644 | |
| November 13 | at New Mexico | University Stadium; Albuquerque, NM | W 21–8 | 18,038 | |
| November 20 | at Utah | Robert Rice Stadium; Salt Lake City, UT (Holy War) | W 34–12 | 30,503 | |
| December 18 | vs. No. 14 Oklahoma State* | Citrus Bowl; Orlando, FL (Tangerine Bowl) | L 21–49 | 37,812 | |
*Non-conference game; ^{†}Homecoming; Rankings from AP Poll released prior to the game

== Game summaries ==
=== Colorado State ===
| Team | 1 | 2 | 3 | 4 | Total |
|---|---|---|---|---|---|
| Colorado State | 0 | 8 | 7 | 3 | 18 |
| • BYU | 7 | 15 | 3 | 17 | 42 |

- Date: September 18
- Location: Cougar Stadium, Provo, UT
- Game attendance: 33,013

Scoring summary
| 1 | BYU | Jeff Nilsson 9-yard pass from Gifford Nielsen (Taylor kick) | BYU 7-0 |
| 2 | CSU | Davis 5-yard run (Graham run) | Colorado St 8-7 |
| 2 | BYU | John VanDerWouden 35-yard pass from Gifford Nielsen (Gifford Nielsen to Chronister pass) | BYU 15-8 |
| 2 | BYU | John VanDerWouden 26-yard pass from Gifford Nielsen (Taylor kick) | BYU 22-8 |
| 3 | CSU | Harris 1-yard run (Drake kick) | BYU 22-15 |
| 3 | BYU | Taylor 38-yard field goal | BYU 25-15 |
| 4 | CSU | Drake 42-yard field goal | BYU 25-18 |
| 4 | BYU | John VanDerWouden 13-yard pass from Gifford Nielsen (Taylor kick) | BYU 32-18 |
| 4 | BYU | Taylor 21-yard field goal | BYU 35-18 |
| 4 | BYU | John VanDerWouden 12-yard pass from Terry McEwen (Taylor kick) | BYU 42-18 |

Gifford Nielsen completed 13 of 32 passes for 174 yards before leaving late in the final quarter while John VanDerWouden set a single-game conference record with four touchdown receptions. LaVell Edwards beat Colorado State for the first time since taking over BYU in 1972.

=== At Arizona ===
| Team | 1 | 2 | 3 | 4 | Total |
|---|---|---|---|---|---|
| • BYU | 13 | 3 | 0 | 7 | 23 |
| Arizona | 3 | 7 | 3 | 3 | 16 |

- Date: September 25
- Location: Arizona Stadium

Scoring summary
| Q1 | BYU | Taylor 36 yard field goal | BYU 3–0 |
| Q1 | BYU | Taylor 38 yard field goal | BYU 6–0 |
| Q1 | ARIZ | Pistor 52 yard field goal | BYU 6–3 |
| Q1 | BYU | Billick 20 yard pass from Nielsen (Taylor kick) | BYU 13–3 |
| Q2 | ARIZ | Nash 31 yard pass from Krohn (Pistor kick) | BYU 13–10 |
| Q2 | BYU | Taylor 39 yard field goal | BYU 16–10 |
| Q3 | ARIZ | Pistor 20 yard field goal | BYU 16–13 |
| Q4 | ARIZ | Pistor 39 yard field goal | Tie 16–16 |
| Q4 | BYU | Harris 43 yard pass from Nielsen (Taylor kick) | BYU 23–16 |

=== Arizona State ===
| Team | 1 | 2 | 3 | 4 | Total |
|---|---|---|---|---|---|
| Arizona St | 21 | 0 | 0 | 0 | 21 |
| • BYU | 17 | 7 | 16 | 3 | 43 |

- Date: October 30
- Location: Cougar Stadium • Provo, Utah

Scoring summary
| 1 | BYU | VanDerWouden 3-yard run (Taylor kick) | BYU 7-0 |
| 1 | ASU | Mucker 80-yard pass from Sproul (Kush kick) | Tie 7-7 |
| 1 | BYU | Taylor 21-yard field goal | BYU 10-7 |
| 1 | ASU | Mucker 43-yard pass from Sproul (Kush kick) | Arizona St 14-10 |
| 1 | BYU | Harris 35-yard pass from Nielsen (Taylor kick) | BYU 17-14 |
| 1 | ASU | Sproul 1-yard run (Kush kick) | Arizona St 21-17 |
| 2 | BYU | Lowry 2-yard run (Taylor kick) | BYU 24-21 |
| 3 | BYU | Chronister 81-yard pass from Nielsen (Taylor kick) | BYU 31-21 |
| 3 | BYU | Taylor 40-yard field goal | BYU 34-21 |
| 3 | BYU | Christensen 2-yard run (pass failed) | BYU 40-21 |
| 4 | BYU | Taylor 44-yard field goal | BYU 43-21 |

=== At Utah ===
BYU Cougars (8–2) at Utah Utes (3–6)

| Quarter | 1 | 2 | 3 | 4 | Total |
|---|---|---|---|---|---|
| BYU | 7 | 13 | 14 | 0 | 34 |
| Utah | 0 | 6 | 0 | 6 | 12 |

at Rice Stadium, Salt Lake City, Utah

- Date: November 20, 1976
- Game weather: Clear, 56 °F (13 °C)
- Game attendance: 30,503
- Box Score

Game information

First quarter

- BYU – Gifford Nielsen 6-yard run (Dave Taylor kick). BYU 7–0.

Second quarter

- BYU – Mike Chronister 3-yard pass from Gifford Nielsen (). BYU 13–0.
- UTAH – Steve Peake 3-yard run. BYU 13–6.
- BYU – George Harris 25-yard pass from Gifford Nielsen (Dave Taylor kick). BYU 20–6.

Third quarter

- BYU – Jeff Blanc 19-yard pass from Gifford Nielsen (Dave Taylor kick). BYU 27–6.
- BYU – Dave Lowry 2-yard run (Dave Taylor kick). BYU 34–6.

Fourth quarter

- UTAH – Richard Graham 3-yard pass from Patrick Degnan. BYU 34–13.

Top passers

- BYU – Gifford Nielsen – 25/35, 415 yards, 3 TD, 3 INT
- UTAH – Patrick Degnan – 19/42, 270 yards, TD, INT

Top rushers

- BYU – Todd Christensen – 8 rushes, 53 yards
- UTAH – Steve Peake – 13 rushes, 46 yards, TD

Top receivers

- BYU – George Harris – 6 receptions, 134 yards, TD
- UTAH – Michael Cordy – 6 receptions, 117 yards

External videos
- Game highlights

== Personnel ==
1976 BYU Cougars football team roster
Players
Coaches
Offense

| Pos. | # | Name | Class |
|---|---|---|---|
| RB | | Todd Christensen |
| QB | | Gifford Nielsen | RJr |
| WR | 8 | John VanDerWouden | Jr |

Defense

| Pos. | # | Name | Class |

Special teams

| Pos. | # | Name | Class |
|---|---|---|---|
| K | | Dave Taylor |

Head coach

- LaVell Edwards

Coordinators/assistant coaches

Legend

- (C) Team captain
- (S) Suspended
- (I) Ineligible
- Injured
- Redshirt
