= 1976 UCLA Bruins football team =

American college football season

1976 UCLA Bruins football

Liberty Bowl, L 6–36 vs. Alabama
- Conference: Pacific-8 Conference

Ranking
- Coaches: No. 15
- AP: No. 15
- Record: 9–2–1 (6–1 Pac-8)
- Head coach: Terry Donahue (1st season)
- Defensive coordinator: Dick Tomey (1st season)
- Home stadium: Los Angeles Memorial Coliseum

1976 Pacific-8 Conference football standings
	Conf.					Overall
Team	W		L		T	W		L		T
No. 2 USC $	7	–	0	–	0	11	–	1	–	0
No. 15 UCLA	6	–	1	–	0	9	–	2	–	1
Stanford	5	–	2	–	0	6	–	5	–	0
California	3	–	4	–	0	5	–	6	–	0
Washington	3	–	4	–	0	5	–	6	–	0
Washington State	2	–	5	–	0	3	–	8	–	0
Oregon	1	–	6	–	0	4	–	7	–	0
Oregon State	1	–	6	–	0	2	–	10	–	0
$ – Conference champion; Rankings from AP Poll

The 1976 UCLA Bruins football team represented the University of California, Los Angeles during the 1976 NCAA Division I football season. Ranked at 17th in the pre-season AP Poll, former UCLA player Terry Donahue took over as the head coach. The Bruins were 9–2–1 for the season and second in the Pacific-8 Conference. UCLA lost 36–6 in the Liberty Bowl to Alabama.

== Schedule ==
Date	Opponent	Rank	Site	Result	Attendance	Source
September 9	at No. 3 Arizona State*	No. 17	Sun Devil Stadium; Tempe, AZ	W 28–10	50,876	
September 18	Arizona*	No. 5	Los Angeles Memorial Coliseum; Los Angeles, CA	W 37–9	41,651	
September 25	Air Force*	No. 5	Los Angeles Memorial Coliseum; Los Angeles, CA	W 40–7	37,302	
October 2	at No. 8 Ohio State*	No. 4	Ohio Stadium; Columbus, OH	T 10–10	87,969	
October 9	Stanford	No. 5	Los Angeles Memorial Coliseum; Los Angeles, CA	W 38–20	50,894	
October 16	Washington State	No. 4	Los Angeles Memorial Coliseum; Los Angeles, CA	W 62–3	35,508	
October 23	at California	No. 4	California Memorial Stadium; Berkeley, CA (rivalry)	W 35–19	62,228	
October 30	at Washington	No. 3	Husky Stadium; Seattle, WA	W 30–21	47,719	
November 6	Oregon	No. 3	Los Angeles Memorial Coliseum; Los Angeles, CA	W 46–0	32,158	
November 13	at Oregon State	No. 2	Parker Stadium; Corvallis, OR	W 45–14	22,151	
November 20	No. 3 USC	No. 2	Los Angeles Memorial Coliseum; Los Angeles, CA (Victory Bell)	L 14–24	90,519	
December 20	vs. No. 16 Alabama*	No. 7	Liberty Bowl Memorial Stadium; Memphis, TN (Liberty Bowl)	L 6–36	52,736	
*Non-conference game; Rankings from AP Poll released prior to the game

== Personnel ==
1976 UCLA Bruins football team roster
Players
Coaches
Offense

Pos.	#	Name	Class
QB		Jeff Dankworth
WR		Wally Henry
RB		Wendell Tyler

Defense

Pos.	#	Name	Class
LB	40	Manu Tuiasosopo	So

Special teams

Pos.	#	Name	Class

Head coach

- Terry Donahue

Coordinators/assistant coaches

Legend

- (C) Team captain
- (S) Suspended
- (I) Ineligible
- Injured
- Redshirt

== Game summaries ==
=== California ===
Team	1	2	3	4	Total
• UCLA	14	0	7	14	35
California	0	13	0	6	19

- Date: October 23
- Location: California Memorial Stadium
- Game attendance: 65,228

Scoring summary
Q1	UCLA	Dankworth 18 yard run (kick good)	UCLA 7–0
Q1	UCLA	Henry 27 yard pass from Dankworth (kick good)	UCLA 14–0
Q2	CAL	Bresna 1 yard run (Breech kick)	UCLA 14–7
Q2	CAL	Breech 41 yard field goal	UCLA 14–10
Q2	CAL	Breech 41 yard field goal	UCLA 14–13
Q3	UCLA	Touchdown	UCLA 21–13
Q4	UCLA	Tyler 33 yard run (kick good)	UCLA 28–13
Q4	UCLA	Tyler 13 yard run (kick good)	UCLA 35–13

- QB Jeff Dankworth sat out the second quarter with a bruised hip; returned in the third

=== Alabama (Liberty Bowl) ===
	1	2	3	4	Total
Alabama	17	7	3	9	36
UCLA	0	0	0	6	6

1st quarter scoring: Alabama – Bucky Berrey 37-yard field goal; Alabama – Barry Krauss 44-yard interception return (Bucky Berrey kick); Alabama – Johnny Davis 2-yard run (Bucky Berrey kick)

2nd quarter scoring: Alabama – Jack O'Rear 20-yard pass from Tony Nathan (Bucky Berrey kick)

3rd quarter scoring: Alabama – Bucky Berrey 25-yard field goal

4th quarter scoring: Alabama – Bucky Berrey 28-yard field goal; UCLA – Jim Brown 61-yard run (Kick failed); Alabama – Rick Watson 1-yard run (2-point pass failed)

== Awards and honors ==
- All-American: Jeff Dankworth (QB), Oscar Edwards (DB), Jerry Robinson (LB, consensus)
