= Greg Peters (American football) =

American football player (born 1955)

Profile
- Position: Offensive guard

Personal information
- Born: April 27, 1955 (age 71); Fort Belvoir, Virginia, U.S.
- Listed height: 6 ft 7 in (2.01 m)
- Listed weight: 257 lb (117 kg)

Career information
- High school: Los Gatos (Los Gatos, California)
- College: California
- NFL draft: 1977: 12th round, 332nd overall pick

Career history
- Dallas Cowboys (1977)

Awards and highlights
- Super Bowl champion (XII)

Greg Peters (born April 27, 1955) is an American former football offensive guard in the National Football League (NFL) for the Dallas Cowboys. He played college football at the University of California, Berkeley.

== Early life ==
Peters attended Los Gatos High School, where he was a three-year starter at defensive tackle and a two-time All-league selection.

As a senior, he was a two-way player at tackle. He received Most Valuable Lineman in the West Valley Athletic League and All-Central Coast Section honors at the end of the season. He also practiced wrestling.

== College career ==
Peters accepted a football scholarship from the University of California, Berkeley. As a junior, he was a starter at defensive tackle and contributed to the team winning a Pac-8 co-championship in 1975.

As a senior, he was converted into an offensive guard and was named a starter.

== Professional career ==
Peters was selected by the Dallas Cowboys in the 12th round (332nd overall) of the 1977 NFL draft. He suffered a knee injury during rookie camp on July 17 and was lost for the season. He was placed on the injured reserve list on August 11. The Cowboys would go on to win Super Bowl XII. He was waived on August 24, 1978.
