= Mark Nichols (linebacker) =

American football player (born 1956)

No. 58
- Position: Linebacker

Personal information
- Born: October 23, 1956 (age 70); Columbus, Ohio, U.S.
- Listed height: 6 ft 3 in (1.91 m)
- Listed weight: 225 lb (102 kg)

Career information
- High school: Marina (Huntington Beach, California)
- College: Colorado State
- NFL draft: 1978: 8th round, 207th overall pick

Career history
- Oakland Raiders (1978)*; San Francisco 49ers (1978); Minnesota Vikings (1979)*; Denver Broncos (1980)*
- * Offseason or practice squad member only
- Stats at Pro Football Reference

Mark Robe Nichols (born October 23, 1956) is an American former professional football linebacker who played for the San Francisco 49ers of the National Football League (NFL). He played college football for the Colorado State Rams and was selected by the Oakland Raiders in the eighth round of the 1978 NFL draft.

== Early life ==
Mark Robe Nichols was born on October 23, 1956, in Columbus, Ohio. He attended Marina High School in Huntington Beach, California.

== College career ==
Nichols played junior college football at Golden West College 1974 to 1975. He transferred to Colorado State University, where he was a two-year letterman for the Rams from 1976 to 1977. He had two interceptions for 88 yards and one touchdown as a senior in 1977. At the conclusion of his college career, Nichols was invited to the 1977 East–West Shrine Game.

== Professional career ==
Nichols was selected by the Oakland Raiders in the eighth round, with the 207th overall pick, of the 1978 NFL draft. He was released on August 25, re-signed on September 1, and released again on September 2.

Nichols signed with the San Francisco 49ers on September 6, 1978. He played in 15 games for the 49ers during the 1978 season as a reserve linebacker, recording one sack, two forced fumbles, one interception, and three kick returns for 39 yards. He was waived on July 21, 1979, during training camp.

Nichols was claimed off waivers by the Minnesota Vikings on July 23, 1979. He was released on August 20, 1979, after the third of four preseason games.

Nichols signed with the Denver Broncos on February 25, 1980. He voluntarily left camp on July 29, 1980.
