= Bob Leahy (American football) =

American football player and coach (born 1946)

No. 16
- Position: Quarterback

Personal information
- Born: September 5, 1946 (age 80); Lindenhurst, New York, U.S.
- Listed height: 6 ft 2 in (1.88 m)
- Listed weight: 205 lb (93 kg)

Career information
- High school: Lindenhurst
- College: Connecticut; Emporia State
- NFL draft: 1970: undrafted

Career history

Playing
- Pittsburgh Steelers (1970–1971)

Coaching
- Pittsburgh (1973–1974) (JV); Pittsburgh (1975) (WR); Washington State (1976) (OC/QB); Pittsburgh (1977); California (1978) (QB); Oklahoma State (1979–1982) (OC); Michigan Panthers (1983) (QB/WR); Minnesota Vikings (1984) (WR); Buffalo Bills (1985) (WR); Buffalo Bills (1986) (QB/PGC); East Tennessee State (1988) (OC); Liberty (1989–1999) (OC); East Carolina (2000–2002) (WR); Louisiana–Monroe (2003) (assistant HC/WR); Louisiana–Monroe (2004–2005) (assistant HC/WR); Louisiana–Monroe (2006) (associate HC/OC/QB); Louisiana–Monroe (2007–2009) (associate HC/RB); Grambling State (2010) (OC/QB)

Awards and highlights
- Little All-American (1968)
- Stats at Pro Football Reference

Robert V. Leahy (born September 5, 1946) is an American former football player and coach who has more than 35 years of coaching experience at the collegiate and professional levels. During his career, he served as the offensive coordinator at Washington State University, the University of Pittsburgh, Oklahoma State University, Liberty University, the University of Louisiana–Monroe and Grambling State University. Leahy played college football as a quarterback at the University of Connecticut and at Emporia State University during the late 1960s and thereafter spent two seasons with the Pittsburgh Steelers of the National Football League (NFL).

== Coaching career ==
He was the associate head coach of the Louisiana–Monroe Warhawks football team, overseeing the program while the search for a new head coach took place.

Leahy accepted the position of offensive coordinator at Grambling State for the 2010 football season.

== Broadcasting career ==
Currently Leahy has his own sports talk show called Coaches Corner on Talk 540 KMLB in Monroe, Louisiana. His show focuses on faith and football and any other sport topics of importance in Northeast Louisiana.

== Family life ==
Leahy Married Susan Heitchmidt and together they have 3 children. Kristi, Jack and Joby.
