= Shelton Diggs =

American football player (born 1955)

No. 80
- Position: Wide receiver

Personal information
- Born: April 23, 1955 (age 71); San Bernardino, California, U.S.
- Listed height: 6 ft 1 in (1.85 m)
- Listed weight: 190 lb (86 kg)

Career information
- High school: San Bernardino (CA)
- College: USC
- NFL draft: 1977: 5th round, 120th overall pick

Career history
- New York Jets (1977)

Awards and highlights
- National champion (1974)
- Stats at Pro Football Reference

Shelton Diggs (born April 23, 1955) is an American former professional football wide receiver. He played for the New York Jets in 1977.
