= Glen Walker =

American football player (born 1952)

No. 19
- Position: Punter

Personal information
- Born: January 16, 1952 (age 74); Torrance, California, U.S.
- Listed height: 6 ft 1 in (1.85 m)
- Listed weight: 210 lb (95 kg)

Career information
- High school: Gardena (Los Angeles, California)
- College: USC
- NFL draft: 1977: undrafted

Career history
- Los Angeles Rams (1977–1978); Denver Broncos (1981)*; Los Angeles Express (1983)
- * Offseason or practice squad member only

Career NFL statistics
- Punts: 156
- Punt yards: 5,637
- Longest punt: 61
- Stats at Pro Football Reference

Glen Joe Walker (born January 16, 1952) is an American former professional football player who was a punter for two seasons with the Los Angeles Rams of the National Football League (NFL). He played college football at Los Angeles Harbor College before transferring to the USC Trojans. He also played for the Los Angeles Express of the United States Football League (USFL).

== Early life and college ==
Glen Joe Walker was born on January 16, 1952, in Torrance, California. He attended Gardena High School in Los Angeles, California, and earned All-L.A. City Section honors his senior year in 1969.

He was a placekicker and punter at Los Angeles Harbor College in 1970. He then served three years in the United States Army before returning to Los Angeles Harbor College in 1974, resuming his role as both placekicker and punter. He was inducted into the school's Athletic Hall of Fame in 2009.

Walker then transferred to play for the USC Trojans, and was a two-year letterman from 1975 to 1976. In 1976, he converted 10 of 19 field goals, 41 of 48 extra points, and punted 57 times for 2,138 yards.

== Professional career ==
Walker signed with the Los Angeles Rams after going undrafted in the 1977 NFL draft. He played in all 14 games for the Rams in 1977, punting 73 times for 2,568 yards, and completing one pass for 13 yards. He also punted five times in one playoff game that season. Walker was released on August 29, 1978, but was re-signed two days later. He appeared in all 16 games during the 1978 season, recording 83 punts for 3,069 yards. He also totaled eight punts in two playoff games that year. He was released by the Rams on August 20, 1979.

Walker was signed by the Denver Broncos on June 19, 1981, but was later released.

He played in two games for the Los Angeles Express of the United States Football League in 1983, punting nine times for 279 yards.
